= Manipuri MIL =

Meitei language in education

Manipuri MIL ꯃꯅꯤꯄꯨꯔꯤ ꯑꯦꯝ. ꯑꯥꯏ. ꯑꯦꯜ.
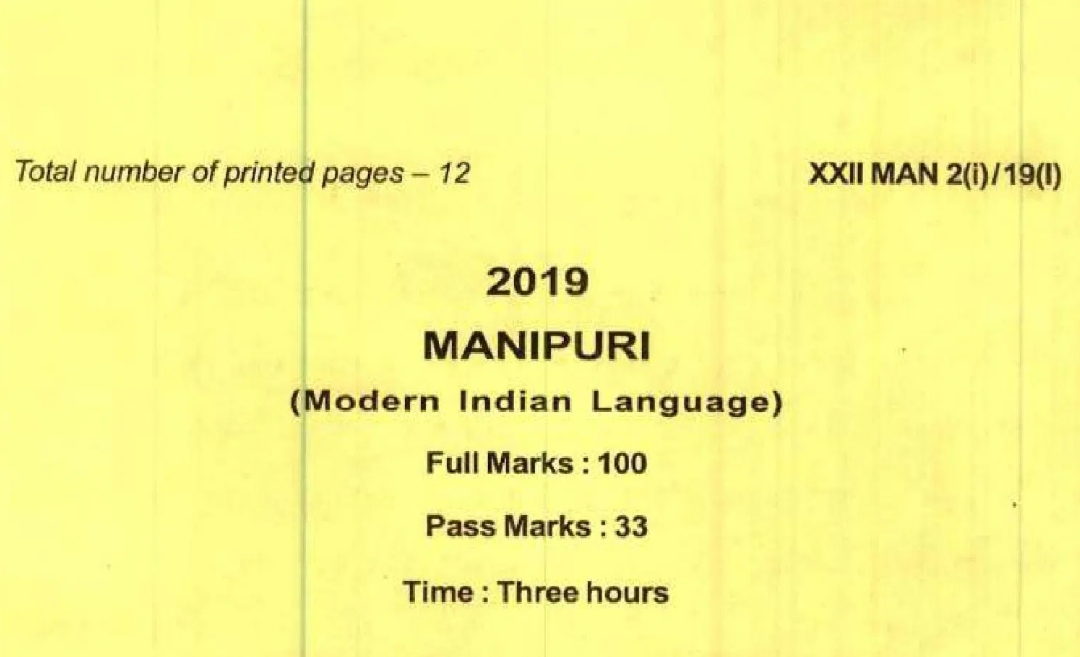
- A cover of a 2019 Manipuri (Modern Indian Language) examination question paper
- Acronym: MAN
- Type: Modern Indian Language (MIL)
- Administrator: Board of Secondary Education Manipur (BOSEM/BSEM); Council of Higher Secondary Education Manipur (COHSEM); Board of Secondary Education, Assam (SEBA); Assam State School Education Board (ASSEB); Assam Higher Secondary Education Council (AHSEC); Directorate of Kokborok and Other Minority Languages (Government of Tripura); Mizoram Board of School Education (MBSE); Central Board of Secondary Education (CBSE); Manipur University (MU); Manipur University of Culture (MUC); Delhi University (DU); Assam University (AU); Gauhati University (GU); Indira Gandhi National Open University (IGNOU); Rabindranath Tagore University, Hojai (RTU)
- Skills tested: knowledge (20%); comprehension (50%); expression (30%)
- Purpose: to make students aware of the importance of critical analysis of literary texts
- Duration: 3 hours
- Score range: 100 (full marks)
- Score validity: 30 (pass marks)
- Offered: Primary education (I-VIII); Secondary education (IX-X); Higher secondary education (XI-XII); Undergraduate education (BA); Postgraduate education (MA-PhD)
- Restrictions on attempts: 0
- Regions: India (predominantly in Manipur, Assam, Tripura, Mizoram, Delhi)
- Languages: Meitei language (officially called "Manipuri")
- Prerequisites: literacy in either Meitei Mayek script, Bengali script or Roman script (depending on the exam regulatory body)
- Compulsory for: Meitei language natively speaking students (from Meitei and Meitei Pangal communities) in Manipur zone

Manipuri MIL (ꯃꯅꯤꯄꯨꯔꯤ ꯑꯦꯝ. ꯑꯥꯏ. ꯑꯦꯜ.), or MIL Manipuri (ꯑꯦꯝ. ꯑꯥꯏ. ꯑꯦꯜ. ꯃꯅꯤꯄꯨꯔꯤ), or simply Manipuri (ꯃꯅꯤꯄꯨꯔꯤ), is an academic discipline and educational assessment (examination paper) that focuses on the study of Meitei language (officially known as "Manipuri") and literature, as an MIL (Modern Indian Language, or Major Indian Language), either in Meitei script, or Bengali script, or Roman script. It is taught at the secondary and higher secondary levels, in the Indian states of Manipur, Assam, Tripura and Mizoram. It is also taught in the Central Board of Secondary Education (CBSE), under subject codes, 111 and 011. For undergraduate and postgraduate degrees, it is taught in various universities, including Manipur University, Manipur University of Culture, Delhi University, Assam University, Gauhati University, Indira Gandhi National Open University, and Rabindranath Tagore University.

== Affiliations ==
In the Indian education system, the Manipuri MIL syllabus is prescribed by the following educational boards:

- Board of Secondary Education, Manipur (BOSEM/BSEM): Secondary level (Classes IX–X).
- Council of Higher Secondary Education, Manipur (COHSEM): Higher secondary level (Classes XI–XII).

=== In other state education boards ===
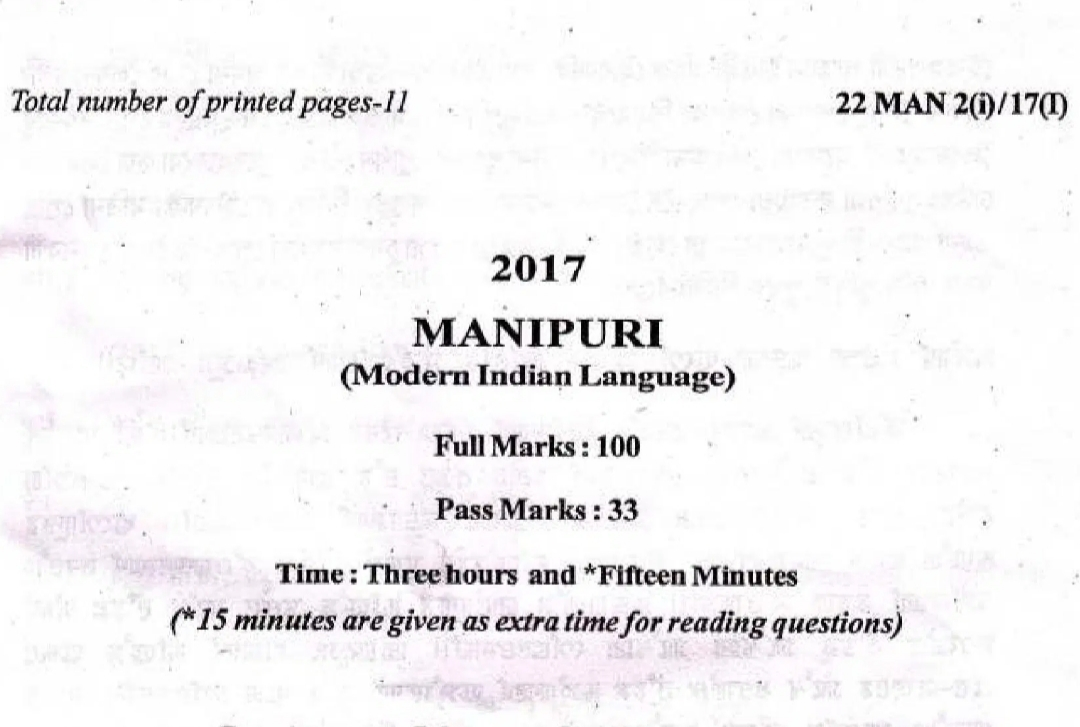
A cover of a 2017 Manipuri (Modern Indian Language) examination question paper

Manipuri (Meitei) is offered as a Modern Indian Language (MIL) by several state education boards and councils outside Manipur. This provision shows the presence of Manipuri-speaking communities in neighbouring states, particularly Assam, Mizoram, and Tripura. The subject is incorporated into the curriculum in accordance with the academic policies and language provisions of the respective state boards and councils.

==== Assam ====
Manipuri is offered as a Modern Indian Language under the Board of Secondary Education Assam (SEBA), the Assam State School Education Board (ASSEB) and Assam Higher Secondary Education Council (AHSEC), which administer the state's school curriculum. The prescribed syllabus consists of a single paper carrying 100 marks. The curriculum includes prose, poetry, grammar, and composition. The prescribed textbook is Anouba Manipuri Wareng–Sheireng (MIL Course), published by the board.

The examination pattern generally allocates marks across literary texts and language components, with additional reading sections that may include topics such as environmental awareness, natural disasters, adolescence education, and value education. Students are required to obtain the minimum passing marks prescribed by the board under its examination regulations.

==== Mizoram Board of School Education (MBSE) ====
The Mizoram Board of School Education (MBSE) provides Manipuri as a language option, for students belonging to minority linguistic communities. At the secondary level (Classes IX–X), students may choose Manipuri as an alternative language subject, subject to the board's curriculum and eligibility provisions.

At the Higher Secondary level (Classes XI–XII), students are required to study prescribed language subjects in accordance with MBSE regulations. Manipuri is available as one of the language options where permitted under the applicable curriculum and subject combinations. The syllabus and examination pattern are prescribed by MBSE through its official curriculum and examination guidelines.

==== Tripura ====
The Directorate of Kokborok and Other Minority Languages, of the Government of Tripura, includes Manipuri among the language subjects available to eligible students in areas where there is demand for instruction in the language. From class 1st to 8th level, Manipuri is offered as a language subject of OML (Other Minority Languages), in accordance with the board's curriculum and subject regulations. The examination typically consists of a written theory component together with an internal assessment, following the marking scheme prescribed by the directorate. The script used for teaching and assessment may vary according to the curriculum, prescribed textbooks, and directorate notifications applicable during a particular academic session. In practice, educational institutions serving Manipuri-speaking communities have used materials in the Bengali script, based on the relevant academic and administrative guidelines. There are ongoing procedures to convert the writing system from Bengali to Meitei Mayek script.

== Curriculum ==
Manipuri MIL is assessed through a written examination carrying 100 marks. The syllabus is generally organized into four major components:

- Prose: Essays, short stories, biographical writings, and historical or literary prose by Meitei authors.
- Poetry: Classical and modern poems studied for their literary features, themes, and cultural significance.
- Drama: Dramatic works and plays reflecting social, historical, and cultural themes.
- Grammar and Composition: Language skills including grammar, vocabulary, sentence construction, reading comprehension, précis writing, summaries, amplification, and composition.

== Assessment ==
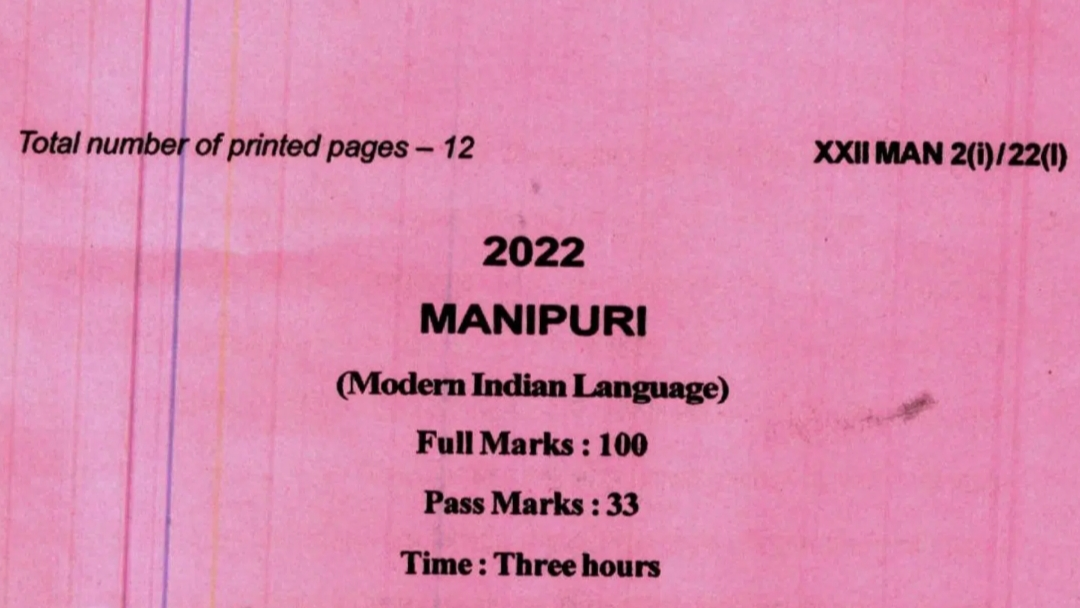
A cover of a 2022 Manipuri (Modern Indian Language) examination question paper

The examination in Manipur evaluates students across different cognitive levels. The prescribed assessment framework allocates marks approximately as follows:

- 20% for knowledge and recall.
- 50% for comprehension and interpretation.
- 30% for application, analysis, and written expression.

Question papers typically include a combination of long-answer questions, short-answer questions, and multiple-choice questions (MCQs).

== Script ==
The Meitei language was historically written in the indigenous Meitei Mayek script. During the eighteenth century, the Bengali (Eastern Nagari) script became the principal writing system for the language.

Since the early twenty-first century, the Government of Manipur has implemented a phased reintroduction of Meitei Mayek in the school curriculum. As a result, the educational boards have progressively adopted the 27-letter Meitei Mayek alphabet as the prescribed script, for Manipuri MIL examinations. The use of the Bengali script for school-level board examinations has consequently been phased out.

In 2024, Assam Government approved the educational usage of Meitei Mayek (MM) in the state.

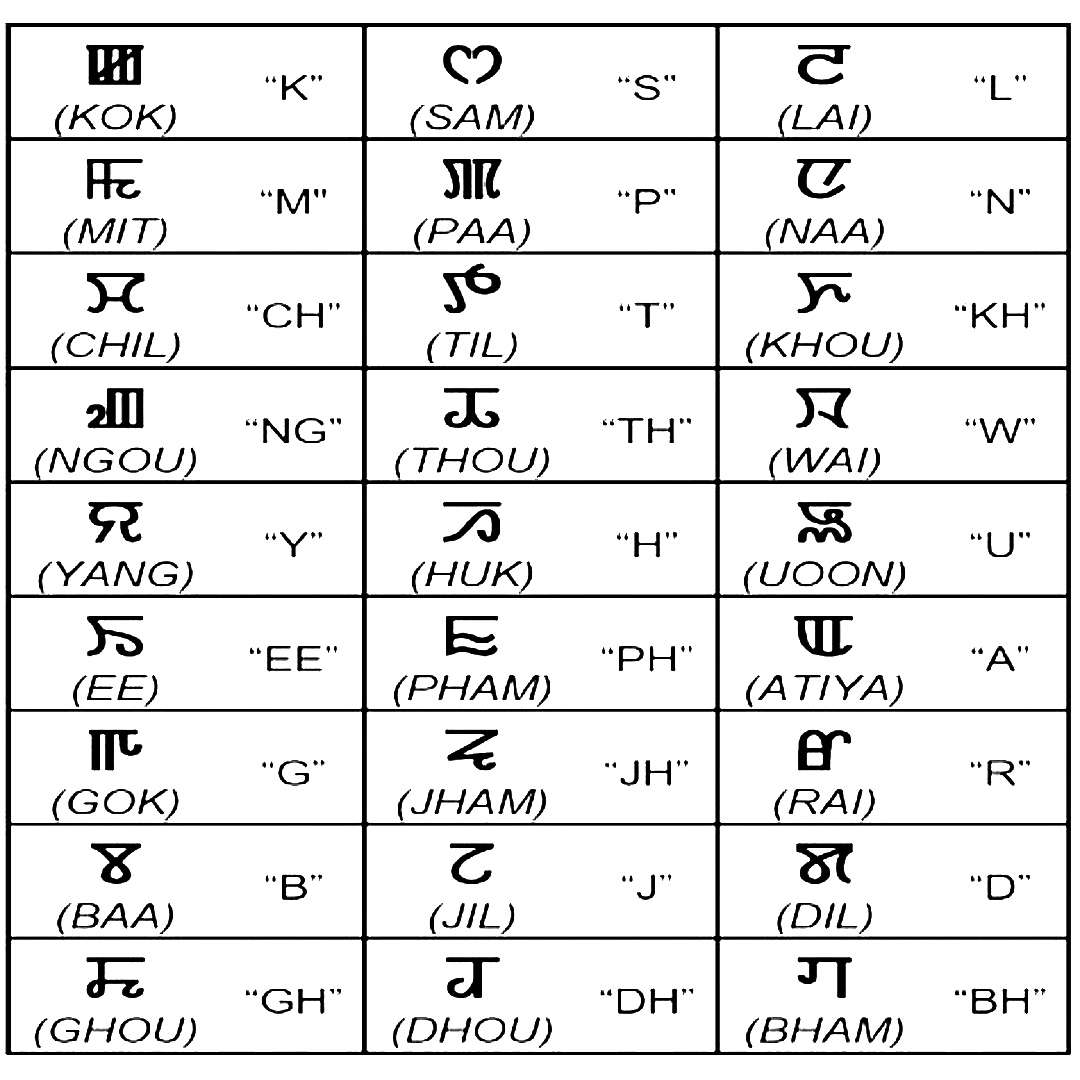
The officially recognized twenty seven letters of the Meitei script which are used in the modern education of Manipuri MIL as "Meetei Mayek (MM)"

=== COHSEM script rules ===
For Council of Higher Secondary Education, Manipur (COHSEM) private candidates, the script used for the Manipuri MIL paper depends on the year of passing the HSLC Examination. Candidates who passed the Board of Secondary Education, Manipur (BOSEM) HSLC Examination in 2015 or later and offered Manipuri as MIL are required to write the Higher Secondary Examination in Meitei (Meetei) script. Candidates who passed before 2015, when Manipuri was commonly offered in Bengali script, are instead required to appear in Alternative English in place of the Manipuri MIL paper. These provisions apply from the Higher Secondary Examinations of 2025 for admission-related MIL regulations and from the 2026 Higher Secondary Examination for the script-related provision concerning private candidates.

== Subject opting rules ==
Under the Council of Higher Secondary Education, Manipur (COHSEM), Manipuri is one of the recognized Modern Indian Languages (MIL) that may be offered in Higher Secondary classes (XI–XII). Students who passed the HSLC Examination under the Board of Secondary Education, Manipur (BOSEM) and whose mother tongue is Manipuri are ordinarily required to continue offering Manipuri as their MIL in Higher Secondary education. BOSEM students who previously studied another community language as MIL may change to Manipuri upon producing a valid caste certificate. Students from other Boards or Councils may also opt for Manipuri (in Meitei script) as their MIL in Classes XI–XII, including those who previously studied Alternative English or a different language, subject to the Council's regulations.

Students who studied Elementary Manipuri (Roman Script) in the HSLC Examination are permitted to offer Alternative English instead of an MIL in Higher Secondary education. Likewise, students from outside Boards or Councils who did not study any of the recognized MIL subjects, or who studied a different language, may choose either Manipuri (where available in the admitting institution) or Alternative English in accordance with the prescribed eligibility conditions.

== See also ==
- State Level Committee for declaration of Manipuri Language as Classical Language of India
- Modern Meitei language
- Medieval Meitei language
- Ancient Meitei language
- Meitei grammar
- Meitei proverbs
- Meitei philosophy
- Meitei mythology
- Meitei folklore
