= Langlon =

The Langlon (ꯂꯥꯡꯂꯣꯟ) is a classical Meitei language literary work written by Wahengba Madhabram. It is often referred to as the Meitei Chanakya Slok because of its erudition and moral teachings. The work is relatively short, consisting of twelve long paragraphs that present important maxims, with prayers at the beginning and end.

== Structure and content ==
Langlon begins and ends with prayers. The main text contains twelve paragraphs, each filled with moral and practical advice. Although brief, the work is noted for its concise and meaningful maxims.

== Example of teachings ==
A liberal translation of the last, shorter paragraph illustrates the style and content of Langlon:

The grasses grow thick and long where tigers live, showing a mutual dependence. Success comes from understanding and cooperation, respecting elders, and treating juniors with care. Advice should be sought from seniors, while the views of younger people should also be considered. Elders should be served, even at personal hardship, and messages delivered with courtesy. Gratitude should not be demanded. A teacher without disciples, a patriarch without family, or a person without friends cannot achieve respect. Guidance and careful speech are essential. One should seek companions capable of handling challenges, follow the path of the devoted, show reverence to God, and befriend those with similar temperament.

== Selected maxims ==
Langlon also includes several notable maxims:

- Self-conceit is more intoxicating than wine and should be avoided. One should not diminish themselves in the eyes of others, nor allow their reputation to be cheapened.
- There is no fixed providence in life; fate is shaped by actions, like clay on a potter's wheel. Every great achievement starts small.
- Everyone has the potential for a prosperous life, but without education, guidance, or good friends, one may fail.
- A person who is dishonest, crooked, or arrogant is like a mad dog, harming themselves and others.

== Style and themes ==
The opening and closing prayers use traditional verse forms and archaic language. The concluding section praises King Chingthangkhomba, the patron of the author. The text reflects both moral guidance and the humility of Wahengba Madhabram.

== See also ==
- Sintha Lamlen
- Meitei proverbs
- Meitei philosophy
