= Subika =

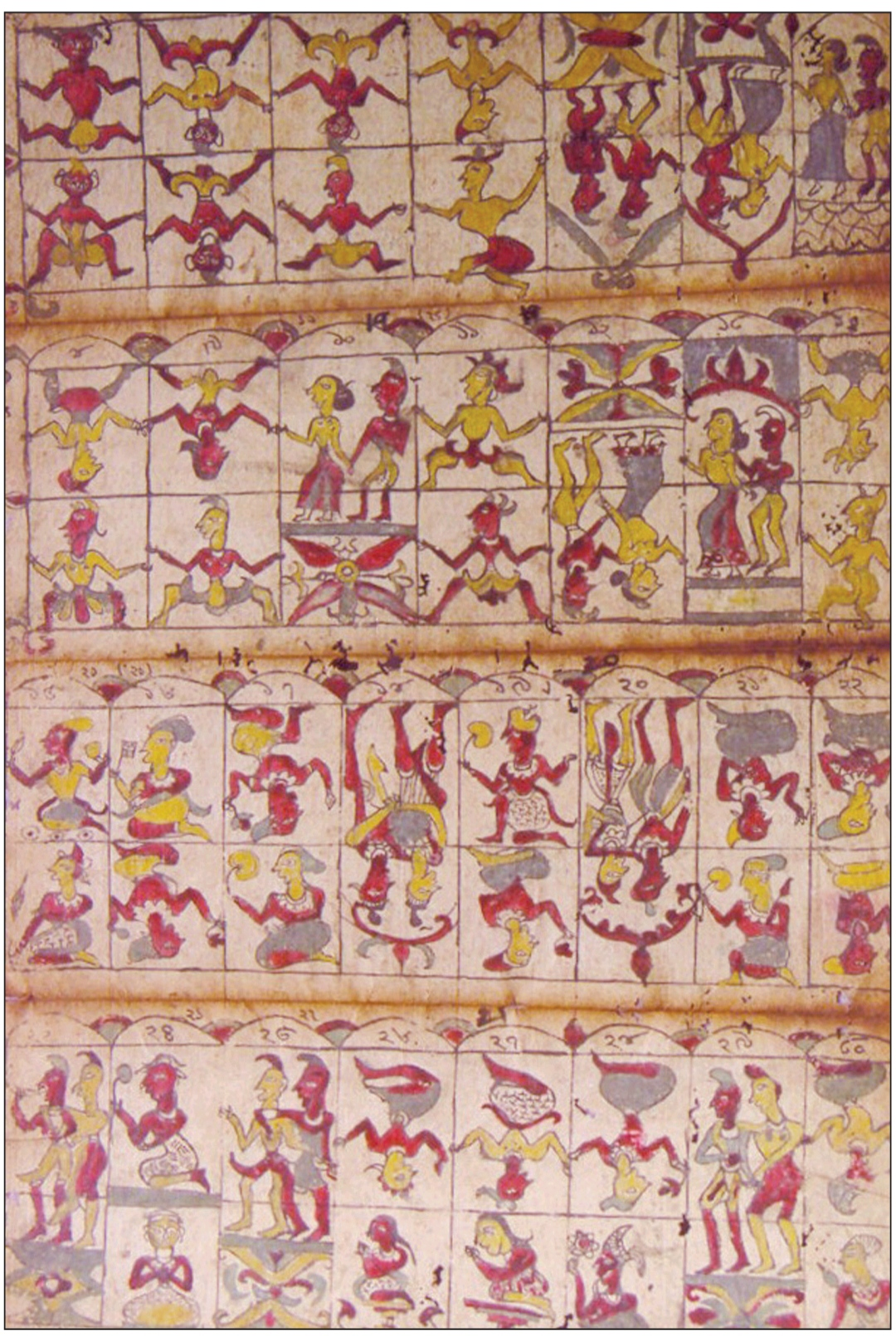
Folios of the Subika — Classical Meitei illustrations for manuscript paintings

The Subika manuscript is a 17th-century Meitei text on astronomy and cosmology, composed during the reign of King Khagemba of Kangleipak (early Manipur kingdom), who ruled from 1597 to 1652 CE. The manuscript, written in the Classical Meitei language using the Meetei Mayek script, is a significant document in the scientific and cultural history of early Manipur.

== Description ==
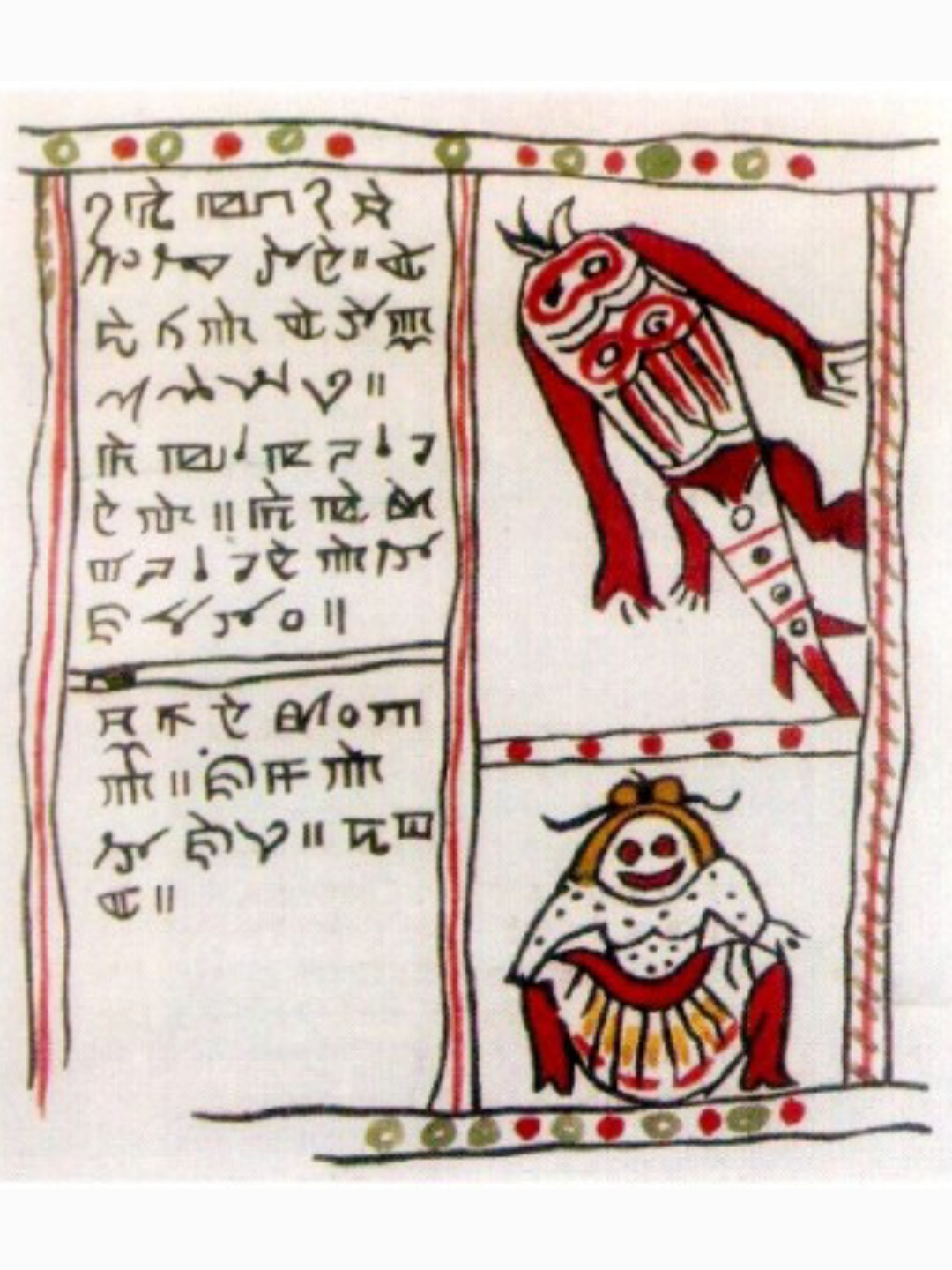
Depictions of human figures in the illustrations from the Subika (18 × 12 cm)

The manuscript consists of 47 folios made from agarbak (Meitei: ꯑꯒꯔꯕꯥꯛ), the bark of the aloe tree. It is a treatise on celestial phenomena, astrological predictions, and cosmic order. While the identity of the author or scribe remains unknown, the Subika was widely respected for its insights and predictive power.

== Usage and cultural significance ==
The Subika was traditionally consulted by the royal family before making important decisions or undertaking major events, such as wars, royal marriages, religious rituals, or festivals. The text was believed to provide reliable forecasts based on astronomical alignments and was considered essential for maintaining cosmic and social harmony.

Even today, the manuscript is regarded by some in Manipur as a source of accurate and trustworthy predictions, reflecting its continued influence in Meitei cultural and spiritual life.

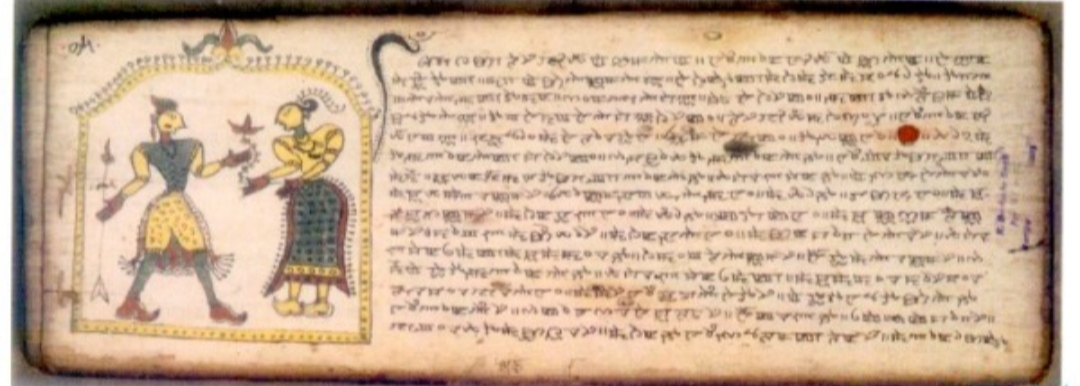
Depictions of male and female in the illustrations from the Subika, a Meitei language manuscript (bark of Aquilaria agallocha) in Meitei Mayek script (34 × 13.5 cm)

== Ownership and preservation ==
Originally owned by the royal family of Manipur, the manuscript was later entrusted to royal scholars for safekeeping and consultation. In modern times, the manuscript was donated to the Manipur State Archives in Imphal by Bobby Wahengbam (Meitei: ꯕꯣꯕꯤ ꯋꯥꯍꯦꯡꯕꯝ), a descendant of the royal scholar lineage.

== Language and script ==
The entire text is composed in the Meitei language, using the traditional Meetei Mayek script. It represents one of the rare surviving examples of early scientific Meitei literature and demonstrates the integration of indigenous knowledge systems with statecraft and ritual life.

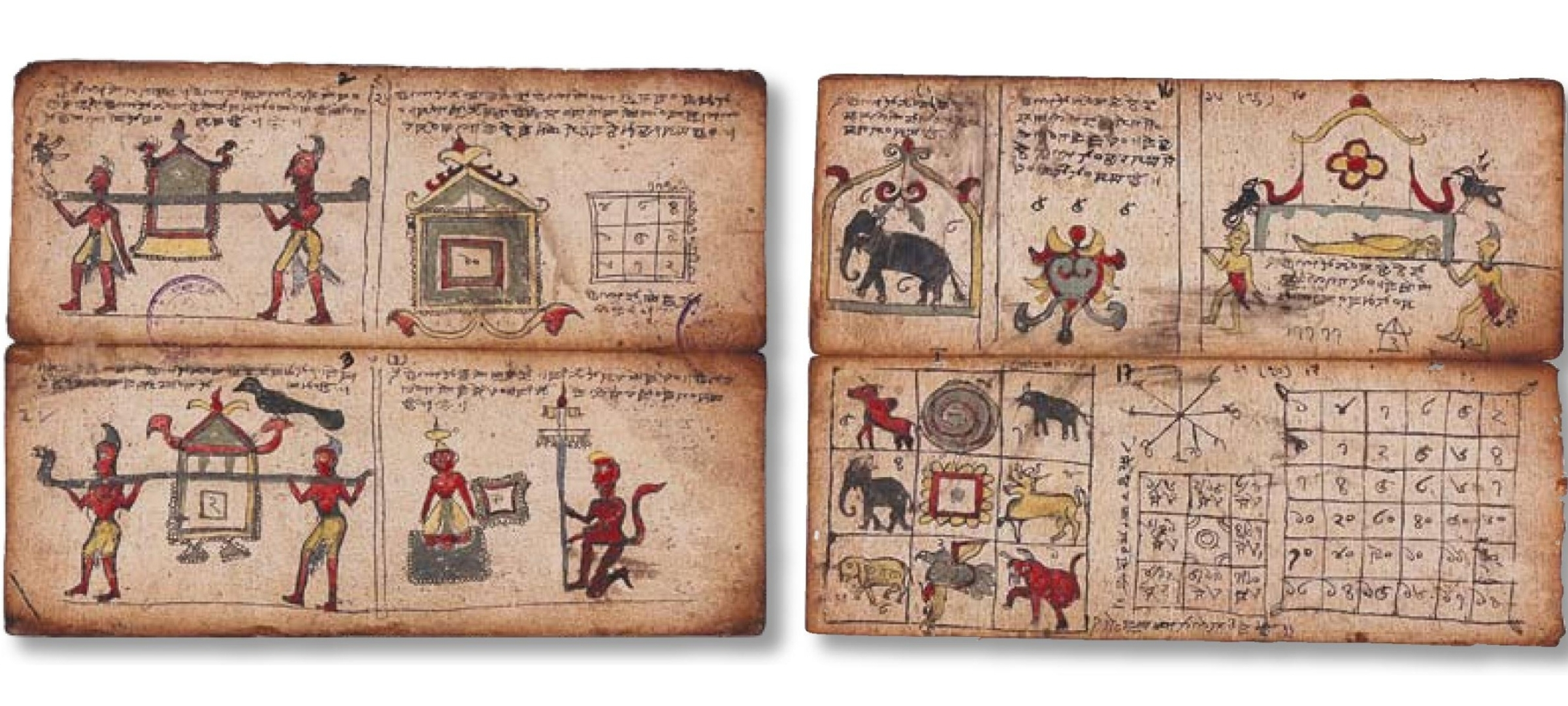
Subika illustrated manuscript text in traditional Meetei Mayek

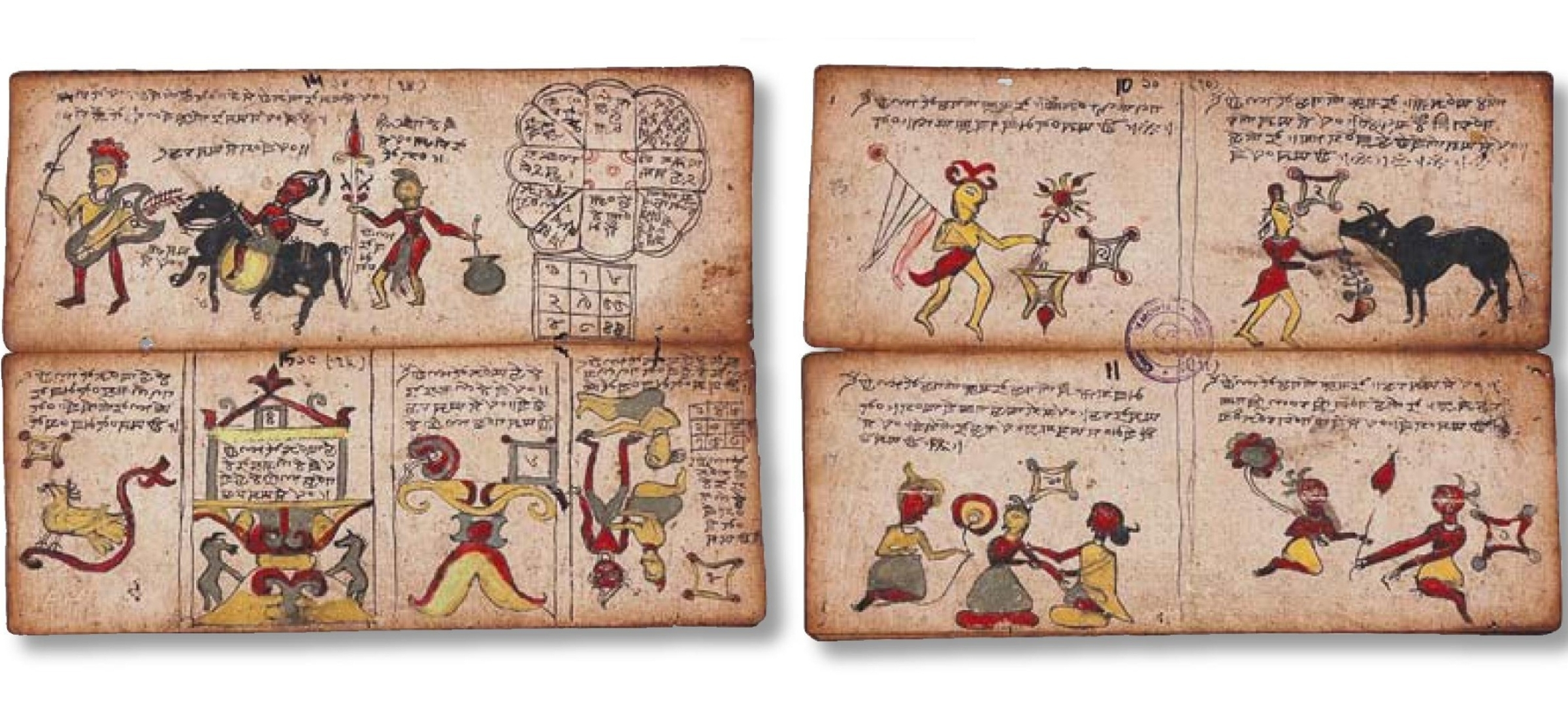
Subika illustrated manuscript text in traditional Meetei Mayek

== See also ==
- Leichillon
- Maibarol
- Meitei astronomy
- Paphal
- Ancient Meitei language
- Medieval Meitei language
- Modern Meitei language
- Thougallon
- Amailon
- Hidaklon
