= Kanglei philosophy =

Kanglei philosophy or Philosophy of Kangleipak refers to:

- Meitei philosophy
- Philosophy of Sanamahism
