= Medieval Meitei =

Medieval Meitei (or Medieval Manipuri) may refer to:

- A person belonging to Meitei ethnicity, living in the medieval times
- Of or relating to Meitei civilization of the medieval times
- Medieval Meitei language, also known as Medieval Manipuri, a form of Meitei language used in the medieval times
- A body of Meitei literature of the medieval times
- A form of Meitei script, used in the medieval times
