= Indian medicine =

Indian medicine may refer to:

- Traditional Indian medicine:
  - Ayurveda
  - Hidaklon
  - Maibaron
  - Siddha medicine
  - Unani medicine
  - Medical ethnobotany of India
- Healthcare in India
  - Medical tourism in India
  - Pharmaceutical industry in India
- Native American ethnobotany
  - Traditional Alaska Native medicine

== See also ==
- Traditional Tibetan medicine or Sowa, also practiced in India
