= Bhai Vasti Ram =

Sikh saint

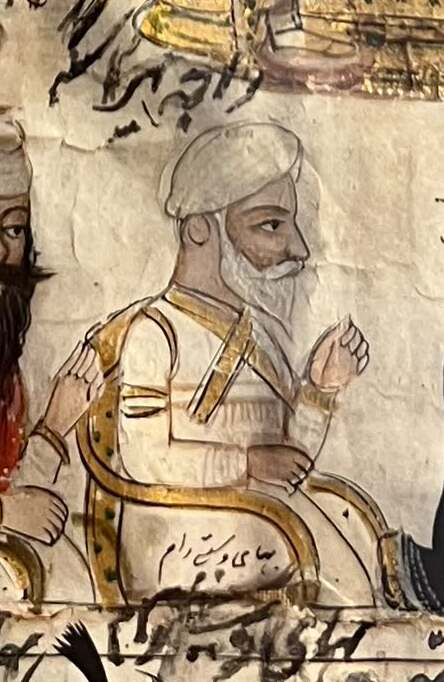
Bhai Vasti Ram, detail of a painting of the court (darbar) of Maharaja Ranjit Singh, Rambagh Museum, Amritsar, ca.1849–50

Bhai Vasti Ram (1708–1802), also spelled Bhai Wasti Ram, was a Sikh herbal doctor and the teacher of Maharaja Ranjit Singh. He was popular in the Majha region of Punjab as a religious saint but his influence also reached the Doaba region. He was the grandfather of Bhai Ram Singh. He was part of the bhai tradition of Sikhism.

== Biography ==
He was the son of Bhai Bulaka Singh, who had accompanied Guru Gobind Singh to the Deccan in 1707 but returned to Punjab and resided in Lahore or perhaps Gurusar Satlani near Amritsar. Bulaka Singh had three sons in Lahore, Amolak Ram, Sahai Ram (died 1793), and Vasti Ram. Vasti Ram became meditative and adopted the garb of a holy-man. Vasti Ram became knowledgeable in medicine, especially herbs, and survived the persecution of Sikhs during the 18th century. His medical abilities and his practice of treating people for free and not discriminating based upon caste or religion led him to becoming a popular religious figure amongst the Sikhs, including their leaders, with supernatural feats being attributed to him. One tale involves him sucking a snake-bite wound of a low-caste sweeper woman to cure her. Another tale involves him being sent garbage as a "gift" by someone with enmity against him but Vasti Ram wholeheartedly accepted the gift without judgement.

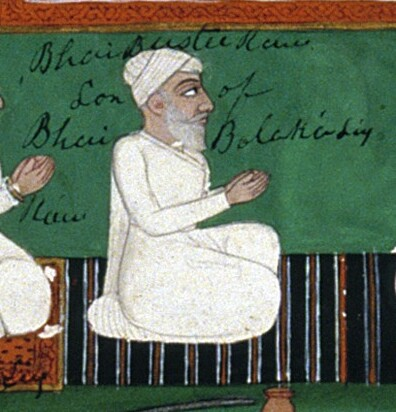
Bhai Vasti Ram, detail from a 19th century painting

Vasti Ram was held in high-regard by the Sikh triumvirate rulers of Lahore and by Jhanda Singh and Ganda Singh, all belonging to the Bhangi Misl. He was also respected by Jassa Singh Ahluwalia and Fateh Singh Ahluwalia of the Ahluwalia Misl. Despite the high regard he held amongst the Sikh leaders, Vasti Ram never accepted any jagir or land grants to him and distributed any material gifts he did receive to the destitute. A young Ranjit Singh was devoted to Vasti Ram and it is claimed that Ranjit Singh was victorious in the Battle of Bhasin (1800) against the coalition forces of Gulab Singh Bhangi, Sahib Singh of Gujrat, Jodh Singh of Wazirabad, and Jassa Singh Ramgarhia, due to Vasti Ram's blessings. A bunga (mansion) associated with him was located near the Golden Temple in Amritsar situated near Rambagh Gate. The locality of Dhab Bhai Vasti Ram in Amritsar is also named after him.

His samadhi is located near the Lahore Fort, marking the location he was cremated at in 1802. Kirpal Singh and Harjot Oberoi claims he died in 1803. Vasti Ram had two sons, Harbhaj and Harnam, with the former having three sons named Kahn Singh (died 1837), Ram Singh, and Gobind Ram. He was succeeded as a religious figure by Bhai Koma Singh and by his grandson Bhai Ram Singh. His samadhi in Lahore was damaged in an revenge-attack after the 1992 demolition of the Babri Masjid but was restored in 2018 by the Department of Archeology, Punjab.
