= Bethel Mission =

Bethel Mission may refer to:

- Bethel Mission, German East Africa
- Bethel Mission, Shanghai
- Bethel Mission School, India

== See also ==
- Bethel Institution
