= Sintha Lamlen =

The Shintha Lamlen (ꯁꯤꯟꯊꯥ ꯂꯝꯂꯦꯟ), also spelled as the Sintha Lamlen, is a classical Meitei language book of maxims. The sayings in the book come from practical experience. It was composed during the time of Meitei King Maharaja Goursahyam (1753–1763) of the Manipur kingdom. Goursahyam ruled alternately with his younger brother Maharaja Chingthangkhomba, each taking a five-year term. Unlike some earlier works, Shintha Lamlen is written in poetry.

== Themes and purpose ==
The maxims in Shintha Lamlen give advice on many subjects. They describe how a king should treat his people, how officers should be chosen for different duties, and how soldiers should carry out their tasks. They also explain how an individual should act responsibly in daily life.

=== Strength and weakness ===
A show of strength by an empty-headed person is compared to building a fence with small bamboo branches. But in a fierce battle, that person’s strength may still be useful.

=== Wisdom and ability ===
A person who has both intelligence and physical strength is compared to a tall mountain recognized by everyone.

=== Fairness and good conduct ===
Someone who treats all people equally—children, women, the poor, and the rich—and who works for the welfare of the king is considered a good person.

=== Harmful qualities ===
A person who is guided by personal prejudice, has an unsteady mind, often changes his statements, acts impulsively, and does not speak the truth brings harm to everyone.

=== Courage in battle ===
A person who gives his life in a great battle, even after the whole contingent has fallen, gains immortal fame.

=== Dishonor in retreat ===
Losing one’s life after retreating from battle is described as a worthless birth.

=== True wisdom ===
- A wise person looks at both pleasure and misfortune with calmness. He does not boast of his wealth or suffer deeply from misery.
- He accepts everything as already ordained, feels no envy for others’ property, and remains content.
- He believes that the path of righteousness is like heaven and that the mind is one’s true companion.
- With these thoughts, he stays prepared for the final journey of life.

== See also ==
- Meitei proverbs
- Sanamahism
- Meitei philosophy
