= Bhai Ram Singh (courtier) =

Sikh courtier (died 1846)

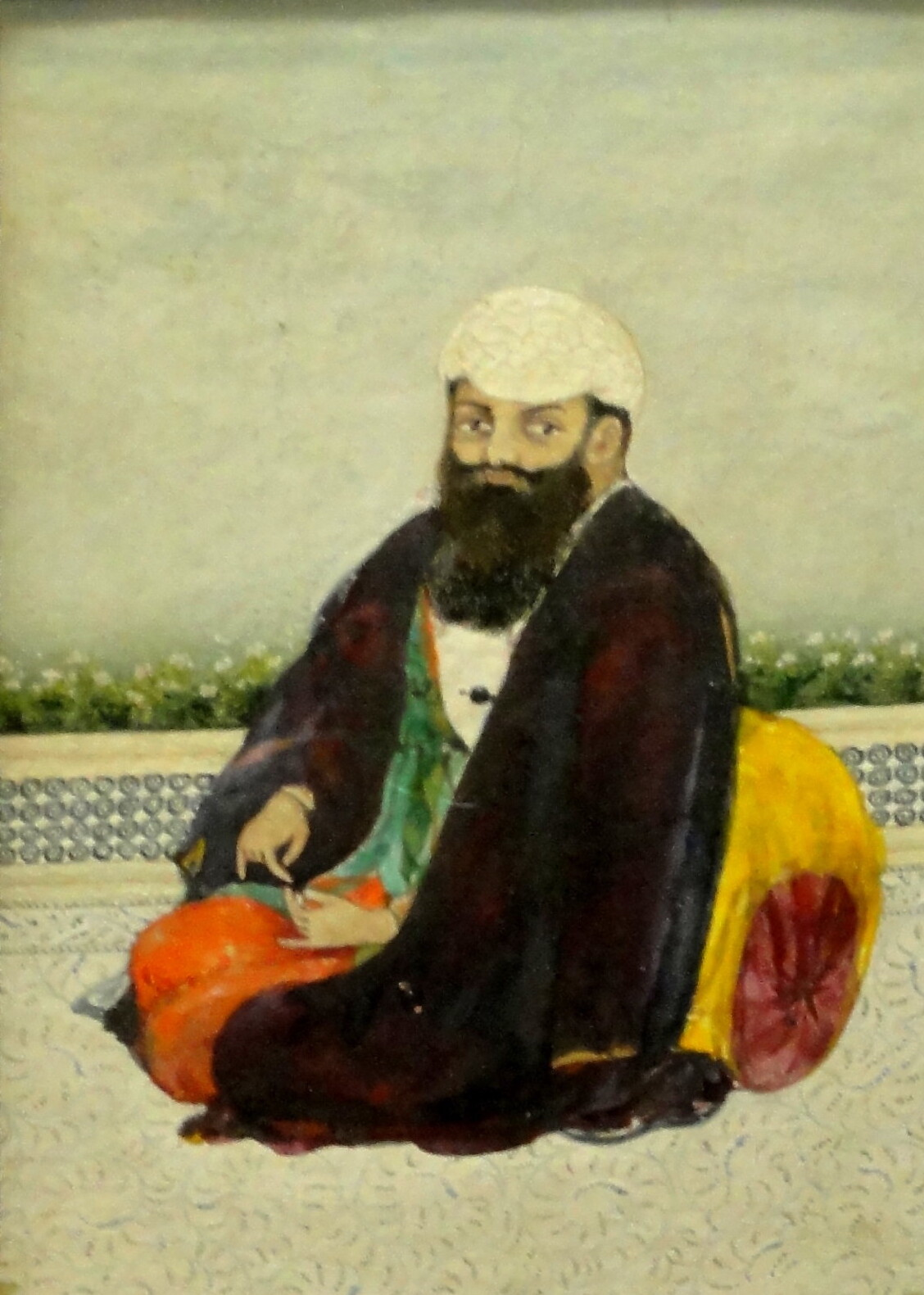
Painting of Bhai Ram Singh, Lahore Museum

Bhai Ram Singh (died 1846) was a Sikh courtier during the Sikh Empire who served as its prime minister. He was a scholar of Sanskrit and skilled in Persian, medicine, and politics. He belonged to the bhai lineage of Vasti Ram, being his grandson. A proponent of Sikhism, around 250 gurdwaras were constructed under his purview. He was one of the few courtiers allowed to be seated in the presence of the maharaja.

== Biography ==
=== Under Ranjit Singh ===
Ram Singh was the son of Bhai Harbhaj (died 1813), a doctor of Maharaja Ranjit Singh, and the grandson of Bhai Vasti Ram. He had two brothers, Bhai Kahn Singh and Bhai Gobind Ram. Ram Singh became an important figure of the Lahore durbar, often facilitating meetings between the maharaja and notable figures (acting as an intermediary or interpreter) and being consulted for matters. During military campaigns, his tent was connected to the maharaja's. As the royal physician, he practiced using indigenous herbs. Along with Fakir Aziz-ud-din, he was one of the few courtiers who advocated for friendly relations with the British East India Company and support them during the First Anglo-Afghan War. This led to the signing of the Tripartite Treaty of 1838.

=== Under Kharak Singh and Nau Nihal Singh ===
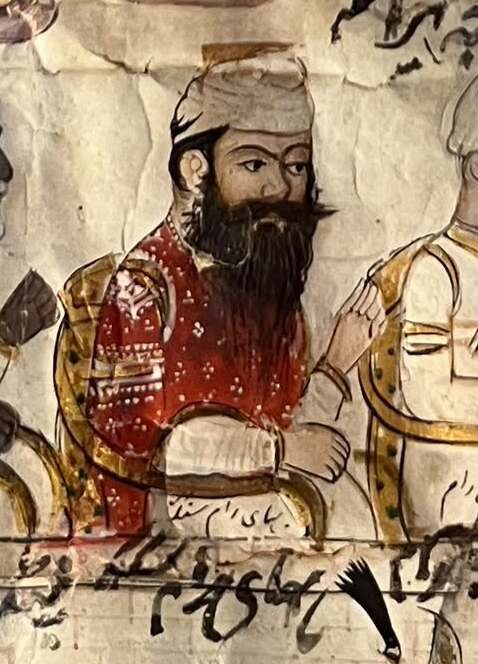
Bhai Ram Singh, detail of a painting of the court (darbar) of Maharaja Ranjit Singh, Rambagh Museum, Amritsar, ca.1849–50

After the death of Ranjit Singh, Bhai Ram Singh was responsible for the turban-tying and tilak-application ceremonies of his son and successor, Kharak Singh. Kharak Singh's son, Nau Nihal Singh, underwent the pahul baptism through the hands of Bhai Ram Singh. Internal power struggles led to the murder of Kharak Singh's prime minister and brother-in-law Chet Singh at the house of Bhai Ram Singh by Dhian Singh and Gulab Singh on 8 October 1839. Nau Nihal Singh, the next ruler, preferred to have the guidance of Bhai Ram Singh rather than Dhian Singh and refused to give Dhian Singh a khillat robe to mark him as prime minister. Thus, after Dhian Singh returned to Jammu, Bhai Ram Singh became the prime minister of the Sikh Empire for three weeks until Dhian Singh returned. Rambagh garden in Amritsar was bestowed upon Bhai Ram Singh. Ram Singh, along with his brothers, had a jagir grant worth forty-thousand rupees.

=== Under Chand Kaur and Sher Singh ===
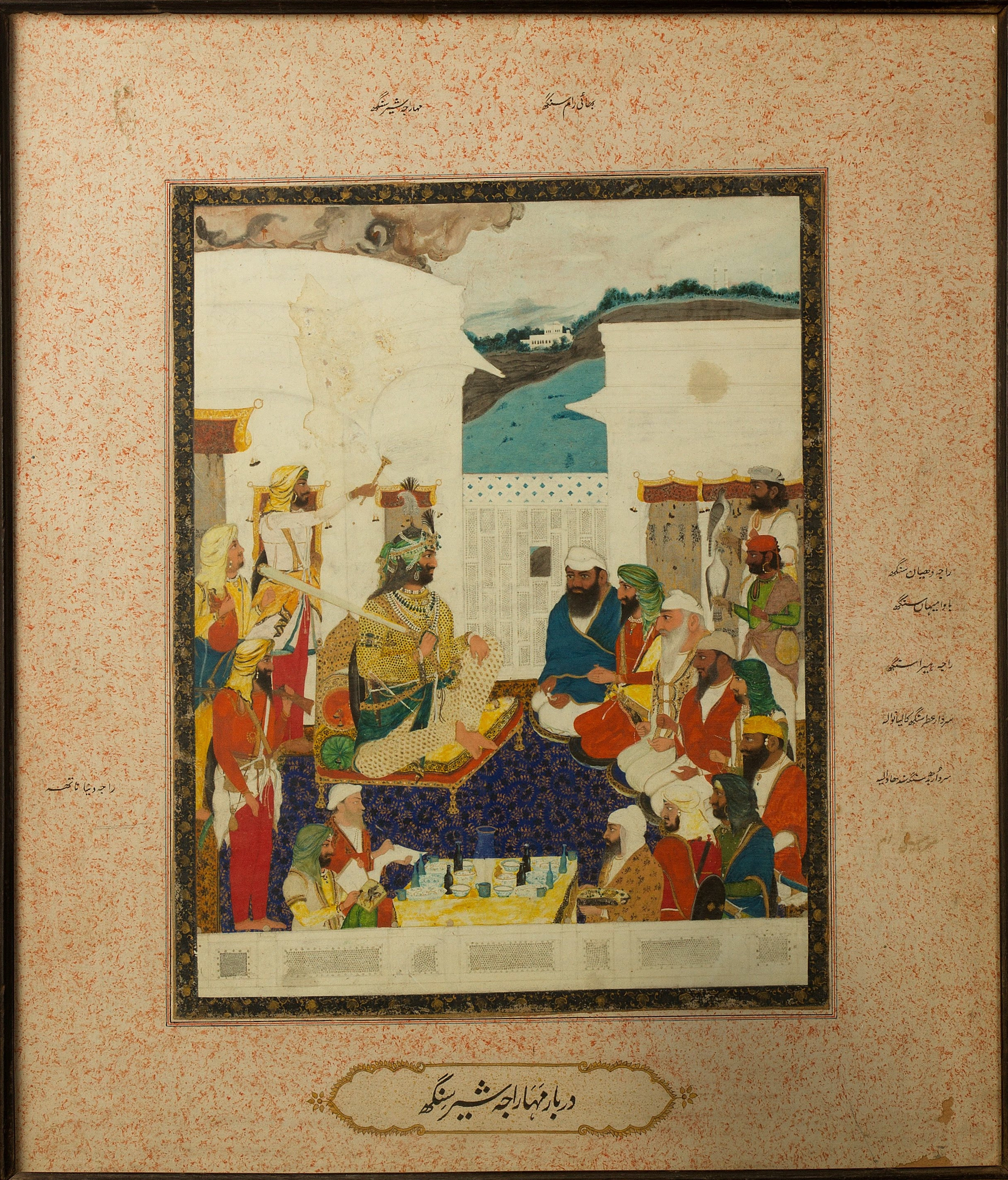
Bhai Ram Singh in the presence of Maharaja Sher Singh

After the death of Nau Nihal Singh, Bhai Ram Singh supported his mother Chand Kaur (widow of Kharak Singh) while Dhian Singh and Bhai Gurmukh Singh supported Sher Singh as ruler. Bhai Ram Singh suggested that Chand Kaur and Sher Singh be married to end the internal power feud but this suggestion was not taken up. Chand Kaur was deposed and Sher Singh asceded as the new ruler, with Bhai Ram Singh deciding to be neutral and giving Sher Singh's his blessings for his rule, giving him eleven pieces of cloth as a robe of honour and candy. He also was responsible for applying tilak on Sher Singh when he officially asceded to the Sikh throne on 27 January 1841. However, Sher Singh removed Bhai Ram Singh from the durbar (court) due to fearing his influence in guise of requesting him to embark on a mission to recover owed money from Diwan Sawan Mal of Multan, with Ram Singh opposing this mission because Sawan Mal was his friend. Instead, Ram Singh decided to go on pilgrimage to the Ganges, namely Kashi, where he encountered Lehna Singh Majithia, who had also abandoned the Sikh court due to similar frustrations. Ram Singh convinced Majithia to return to the court.

=== Under Duleep Singh ===
After the assassination of Sher Singh and Dhian Singh by the Sandhawalias, the young boy Duleep Singh became the new ruler. Jawahar Singh was his minister who advocated for conflict with the British while Ram Singh wanted mediation between the two sides. Ram Singh also requested Raja Lal Singh to not fight with the British and instead opt for peace, however the First Anglo-Sikh War began in 1845. After the war, Bhai Ram Singh was sent to Ludhiana (alongside Gulab Singh and Dina Nath), being the first Sikh signatory on the treaties of 9 March 1846, 11 March 1846, and 17 March 1846, trying to win the most favourable terms for the Sikh side. Ram Singh was part of the Council of Regency that administered the state on behalf of the boy-ruler Duleep Singh. Henry Lawrence began consulting with Bhai Ram Singh for advice. Ram Singh died on 18 October 1846, with a shawl placed upon his corpse by Raja Lal Singh. Lawrence attended the funeral procession. Another source claims he died in Lahore on 18 December 1846 rather than October.
