= Samadhi of Bhai Vasti Ram =

Cenotaph in Lahore, Pakistan

- سمادھی بھائی وستى رام
- Interactive map of Samadhi of Bhai Vasti Ram
- Location: Lahore Fort, Lahore, Punjab, Pakistan
- Coordinates: 31°35′20″N 74°18′26″E
- Designer: Commissioned by Maharaja Ranjit Singh
- Type: Cenotaph
- Material: Marble with Pietra dura inlay
- Beginning date: 1802
- Dedicated date: 1802
- Restored date: Late 2010s (Archaeology Department of Punjab)
- Dedicated to: Bhai Vasti Ram (1701–1802)
- Architectural style: Syncretic Sikh (Hindu-Islamic motifs)

The Samadhi of Bhai Vasti Ram is a historical cenotaph located adjacent to the northern ramparts of the Lahore Fort in Pakistan. The monument commemorates the life of Bhai Vasti Ram (1701–1802), a revered physician and spiritual figure whose influence spanned the turbulent rise of the Sikh Empire.

== Background ==
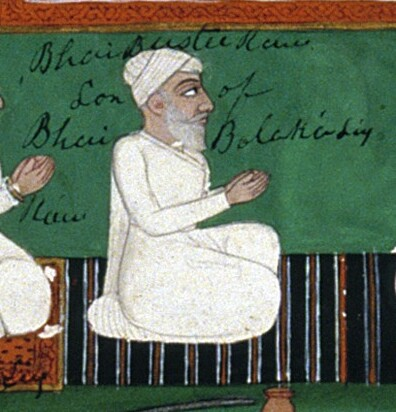
Detail of Bhai Vasti Ram from a 19th century painting

Born in Lahore, Bhai Vasti Ram was the son of Bhai Bulaka Singh, who is recorded in Sikh tradition as a companion of Guru Gobind Singh during his travels to the Deccan. Vasti Ram established a reputation in Lahore for his expertise in indigenous herbal medicine. Noted for his asceticism and humility, he provided free medical treatment to patients regardless of their caste, creed, or religious affiliation.

His longevity allowed him to witness the persecution of Sikhs in the 18th century as well as their eventual political ascendancy. He held significant spiritual sway over the ruling elite; most notably, Maharaja Ranjit Singh was a devoted follower. The Maharaja attributed his decisive victory at the Battle of Bhasin in 1800 to the spiritual blessings of Vasti Ram. Following Vasti Ram's death at the age of 94 in 1802, the Maharaja commissioned the Samadhi and visited the site annually to mark his death anniversary.

== Architecture ==
It follows the syncretic architectural style of the period, amalgamating Hindu and Islamic motifs within a Sikh framework. Standing on a raised square podium with its main entrance facing north, the edifice is clad in white marble. Historically, the exterior was embellished with pietra dura, inlays of multi-hued semi-precious stones forming intricate floral patterns, though much of this ornamentation has been lost to time and vandalism.

According to 19th-century accounts by the engineer and historian Kanhaiya Lal, the site originally featured a tank with fountains positioned in front of the main structure.

== Destruction and restoration ==
The Samadhi is a protected monument under the Archaeology Department of Punjab. However, it suffered catastrophic damage in 1992 when, in reaction to the demolition of the Babri Masjid in India, a mob attacked the site, looting its decorative elements and destabilizing the structure. For nearly two decades, the monument lay in ruins, obscured by wild vegetation and waist-high shrubs. Access was further complicated by the development of the surrounding Greater Iqbal Park.

In the late 2010s, the Archaeology Department executed a restoration project which restored missing architectural components, including marble floor slabs, perforated grills, and door frames, to match the original design. The restoration also revived the water features that had been buried for years.
