= Bethel Mission School =

Location
- Chhura Hmun, Bethel Veng; 23.484219°N 93.325733°E; Champhai, Mizoram; India

Information
- Type: Public
- Motto: "Service to God and men"
- Established: 1996; 30 years ago
- School district: Champhai District
- Principal: K. Malsawmdawngi
- Faculty: Full time
- Gender: Co-ed
- Classes: Nursery – Class X
- Language: English
- Houses: Red Green and Blue
- Colors: White and Grey
- Athletics: Yes
- Affiliation: Mizoram Board of School Education

Bethel Mission School is a private unaided school located in Champhai, Mizoram, India with an enrolment of 450 students in classes Nursery – X. The school was established in 1996. Its curriculum is based upon the Mizoram Board of School Education the governing body in education within the state of Mizoram. The high school section was recognized by the Board in the year 2010.

The school also has its own hostel with limited seats for the students of both genders. Other than the annual Board Examination the students from the school participate in many activities like the Science Congress, Science Exhibitions, Science Seminar. and so on. The school also hosts an annual cultural program during the month of December.

== History ==
Bethel Mission School was established in the year 1996 by R. Vanhnuaithanga at Bethel Veng Champhai with classes ranging from Nursery to Class VII. At that time, there were only about 160 students, the majority of whom were from the locality itself. At that time Class VII annual examination was a Board Examination, where candidates from all over the state of Mizoram competed.

In 2001 the ownership of the school was transferred to K. Malsawmdawngi who then became the Principal and remains so till date. In 2004, Class VIII was introduced and in the subsequent years classes IX and X were also added. The School also changed its location in 2005 to its current location with entirely new infrastructure.

Since its inception, the school has had residential boarding facilities for both genders located nearby the school itself.

As of 2014 there are 420 students of which 62 are Hostel boarders.

== Location ==
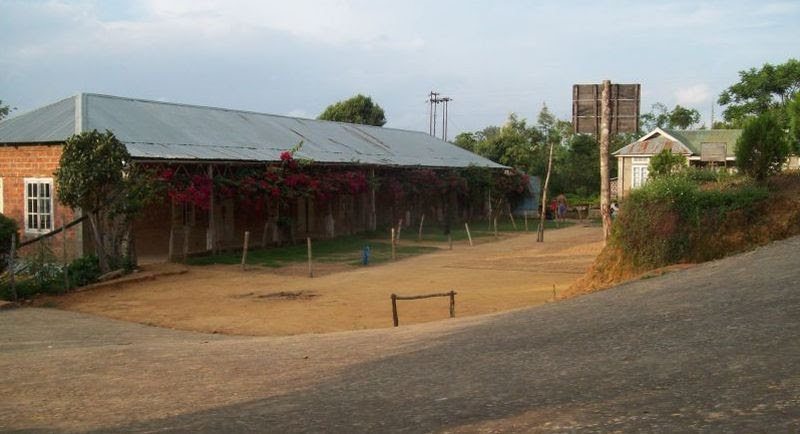
School from the south-west.

The school is located at the northern edge of the town of Champhai which is in the state of Mizoram in India. The name of the neighborhood is Bethel Veng from which the name of the school is derived. The school is located about 1678 m above the mean sea level. The school is connected by a terminal asphalt road to the center of the town which is further connected by both the State Highway and Helicopter Service.

== Infrastructure ==
The School infrastructure includes the main school building, office, a multi - sports ground, where both volleyball and basketball can be played, a Science laboratory, a jam room for studying and playing music and two separate buildings for boys' and girls' hostel.

== Facilities ==
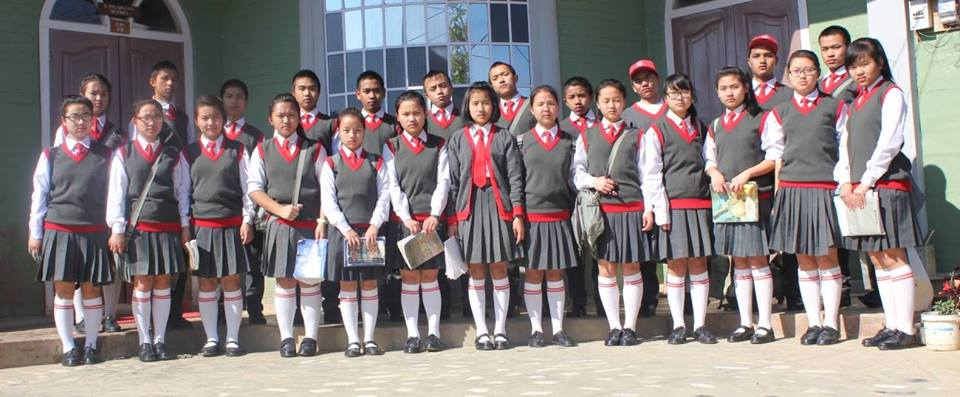
Students, illustrating the school uniform.

Primarily the school has twelve regular classrooms and one digital classroom. The science laboratory is equipped with all the required apparatus and chemicals as per the curriculum. Co-curricular Activities of both Sports and Cultural items are endorsed by the institute which organize an annual sports event sometime during the month of April or May and a Cultural show and competition during the month of December. Though it is a secular institute, Christianity is the dominant religion.

The Digital Classroom was introduced in 2013 provided by Next Education with interactive class and lectures from the elementary level to the High School level.

== Results ==
As per the policy of the Board classes from Nursery to VIII follow the pattern of CCE Scheme at which the school excels. Since its appearance in the Board Examination in 2008, the HSLC candidates so far have achieved 100% result till date. Only in 2011 did the school not have any students who graduated with distinction.

== Faculty ==
The faculty consists of four teachers who teach from Nursery to Class - II. From class III there are separate teachers for each different subject. The high school section employs graduate and post graduate teachers in Literature, Science, Mathematics and Social Science.

As of 2017 there are 16 teaching staff members of which two also serve as Hostel Warden

== Demographics of students ==
The age of the students range from five to sixteen. Of the total students 99.9% are indigenous tribes and sub - tribes of Mizoram, the Mizo. The remaining fraction comprise students from other parts of India who are mainly in the General category.

Many students from the neighbouring Chin State of Myanmar also study in the school who are also of the same stock.

However, all students and teachers practice Christianity as their official religion.

== Hostel ==
The school is equipped with 70 seater Boys and Girls' Hostels situated on the south east side of the institute. At present it has two buildings separate for each of the sexes. Two male wardens for the boys section and one female warden for girls are currently employed. Though not mandatory, most of the HSLC candidates reside in the hostel every year.
