= Medieval Meitei language =

Historical form of the Meitei language

Medieval Meitei
- Medieval Manipuri, Middle Meitei
- ꯃꯌꯥꯏ ꯆꯟꯕ ꯃꯇꯝꯒꯤ ꯃꯅꯤꯄꯨꯔꯤ/ময়াই চন্বা মতমগি মনিপুরী (Mayai Chanba Matamgi Manipuri)
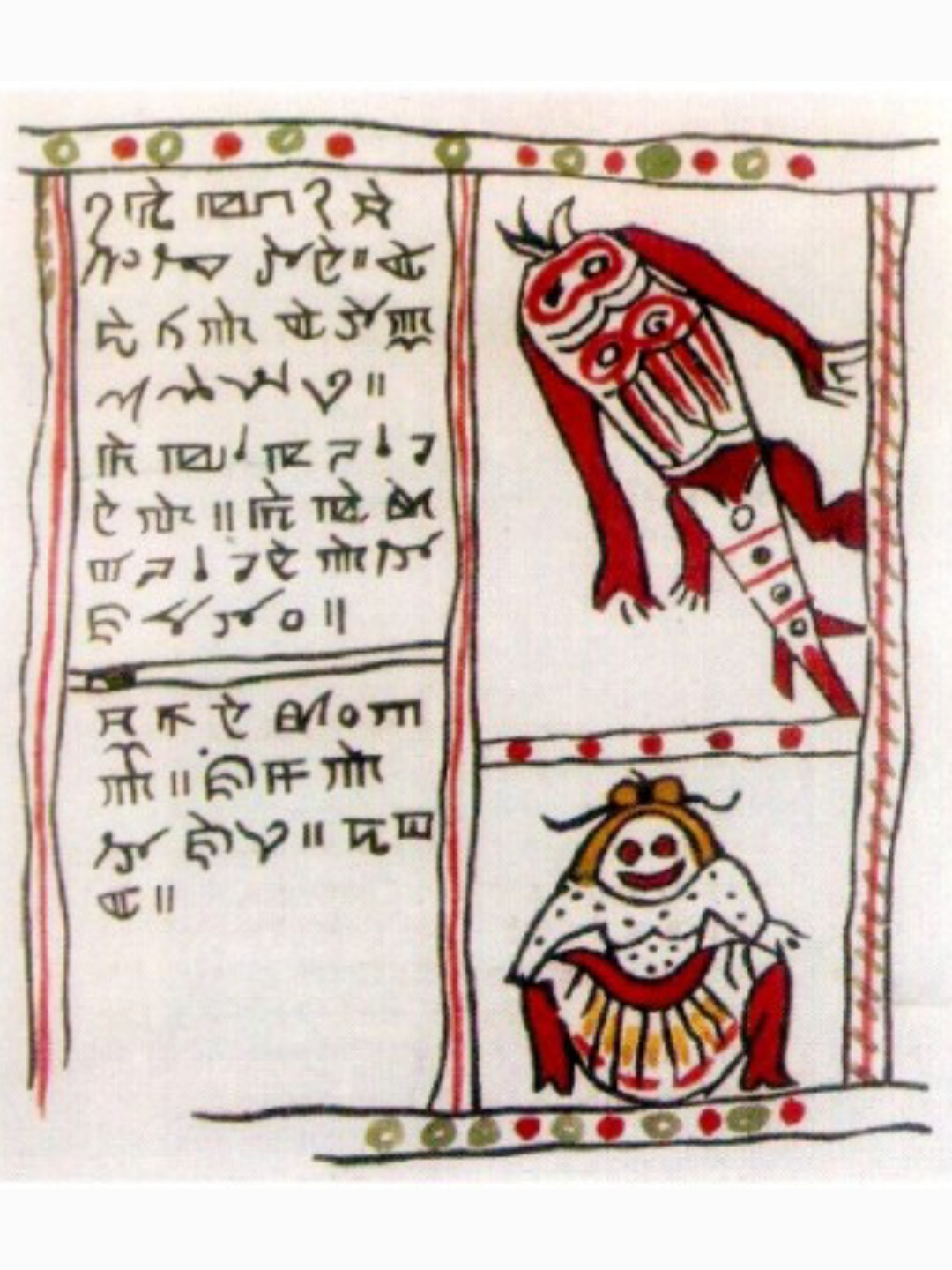
- Illustration of the Subika (ꯁꯨꯕꯤꯀꯥ), a Meitei language manuscript in Meitei script, dated 18th-19th century CE
- Native to: Manipur
- Region: Manipur
- Ethnicity: Meitei ethnicity
- Era: 17th to 18th-19th centuries CE
- Language family: Sino-Tibetan
- Early form: Ancient Meitei
- Writing system: Meitei script, Bengali script

Language codes
- ISO 639-3: –

Medieval Meitei (also known as Medieval Manipuri, Middle Manipuri, or Middle Meitei, or Medieval Meithei) refers to a historical form of the Meitei language spoken in the region of Manipur between the 17th and 19th centuries. It represents a transitional phase between Ancient Meitei (Old Manipuri) and Modern Meitei (Contemporary Manipuri), characterized by significant linguistic, literary, and cultural transformation.

During this period, the establishment of the newly introduced Hindu religion under the Meitei royal patronage led to profound changes in literary production and language use of the long established Meitei civilization. Sanskrit and Bengali languages gained high prestige, particularly in religious and ritual contexts, while indigenous Meitei literary traditions continued to exist in parallel, though with reduced official status. The period is marked by the coexistence of native historical literature and heavily Sanskrit- and Bengali-influenced translations of Hindu religious texts.

== Historical background ==
The development of Medieval Meitei was closely associated with major religious and cultural changes in Manipur. King Pamheiba, also known as Garib Niwaj, the then ruling monarch, strongly supported the propagation of a newly adopted religion of Hinduism, which significantly influenced both cultural practices and language use of the long established Meitei civilisation. As a consequence of this religious shift, Sanskrit and Bengali became prestigious languages within courtly and religious domains. Many ritual and ceremonial activities were conducted in these languages, leading to their increased influence on Meitei literary production. Historical accounts suggest that a substantial number of manuscript texts written in earlier forms of Meitei were destroyed during this period. Simultaneously, new literary works emerged, including translations of Hindu religious texts into Meitei, reflecting the changing religious orientation of the society.

Despite these changes, indigenous Meitei literary traditions did not disappear completely. Instead, these continued to develop independently, although their status was diminished in comparison to the newly dominant religious literary and linguistic forms.

== Literary traditions ==
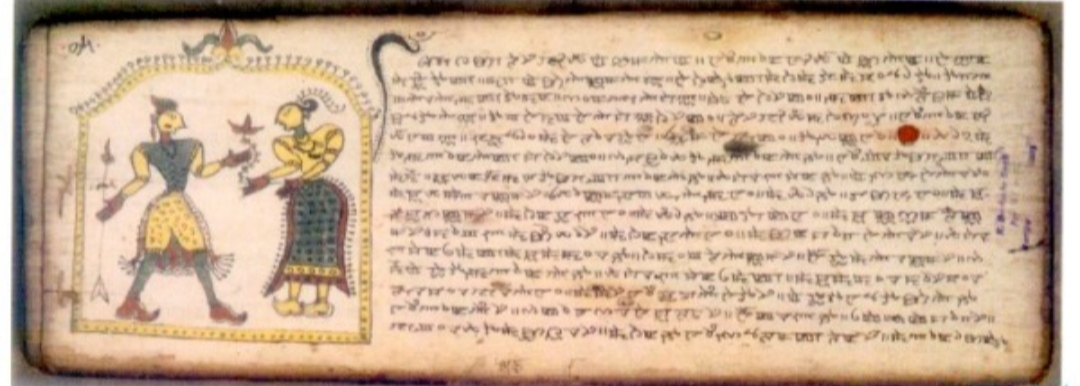
An 18th or 19th century Meitei manuscript of the Subika

Medieval Meitei literature developed in two distinct but coexisting traditions.

=== Indigenous historical and cultural literature ===
The first category consists of texts that are primarily rooted in indigenous Meitei history, mythology, and cultural ideology. These works show strong continuity with earlier linguistic forms and generally contain minimal influence from Sanskrit and Bengali.

Typical examples include:

- Sanamahi Laikan
- Samsok Ngamba
- Chothe Thangwai Pakhangba
- Takhel Ngamba
- Langlon
- Awa Ngamba (Ouwa Ngamba)
- Phamlon

These texts are characterized by limited or no lexical borrowing and a strong retention of native grammatical structures. These are considered closer to its earlier linguistic stage, Ancient Meitei language and literature.

=== Hindu religious and translated literature ===
The second category consists of texts translated or adapted from Hindu religious literature, particularly the Ramayana and the Mahabharata. These works were heavily influenced by Sanskrit and Bengali due to their source material and the religious context in which they were produced.

Representative examples include:

- Ramayan gi Arnaya Kanda
- Sunder Kanda
- Langka Kanda
- Ram Nongaba
- Birat Santhuplon
- Langoi Sagol Thaba

These texts are linguistically distinct from indigenous Meitei literary works due to extensive borrowing of Sanskrit and Bengali vocabulary, as well as the incorporation of foreign phonological and stylistic features.

=== Distinct literary features ===
A defining feature of Medieval Meitei literature is the clear distinction between the two traditions. Indigenous Meitei texts are largely free from foreign loanwords and preserve older linguistic patterns. Religious Meitei translations contain dense lexical borrowing from Sanskrit and Bengali. Both forms coexisted, reflecting a diglossic literary environment in which different registers of the language served different cultural purposes.

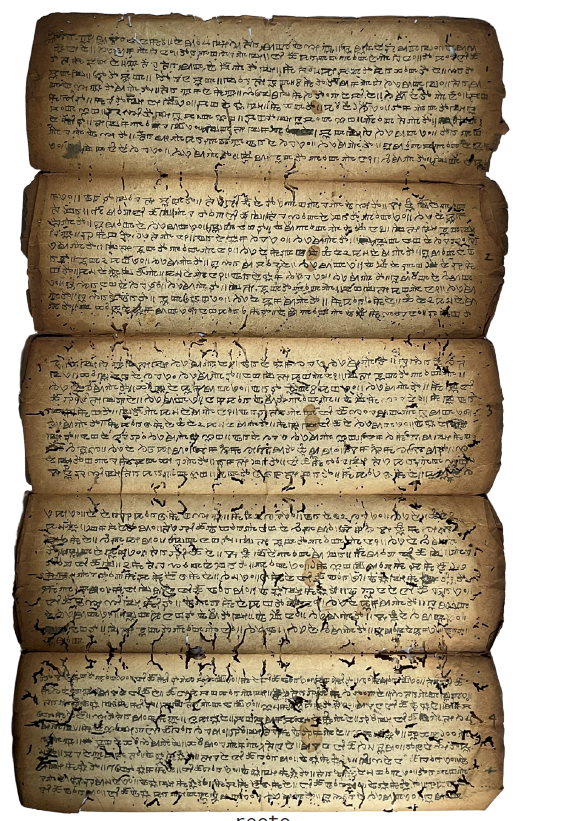
Narda Gita (alias Narot Gita or Narad Gita), a Meitei language manuscript text, about Narada

== Phonology ==
Ancient Meitei language was characterized by six vowels, six diphthongs, and fifteen consonants. During the Medieval period, significant phonological expansion occurred due to both internal development and extensive contact with Indo-Aryan languages.

Nine additional consonantal phonemes were introduced into the language during this period:

- /b/
- /d/
- /dh/
- /g/
- /gh/
- /j/
- /jh/
- /r/

These additions are primarily associated with increased borrowing from Sanskrit and Bengali, particularly in religious and literary contexts.

Diphthongs
ai	əi	oi	ui	əu	au

=== Consonants ===
Consonant Inventory
Manner of Articulation	Phonemes											
Plosives	p	p^{h}	b	b^{h}	t	t^{h}	d	d^{h}	k	k^{h}	g	g^{h}
Affricates			c		j	j^{h}						
Nasals	m		n		ŋ							
Laterals					l							
Flap					r							
Fricatives			s		h							
Approximant			w		y							

Distribution of phoneme

Consonant distribution
Consonant	Initial	Medial	Final
/p/	/poirei/ "name of Meetei"	/məpuŋyai/ "in the middle"	/mitkup/ "a moment of time"
/pʰ/	/pʰeira/ "lap"	/tanpʰaŋba/ "to get"	
/b/	/bramha/ "name of Hindu God Bramha"	/yəibi/ "soul"	
/bʰ/	/bʰakti/ "respect"	/garbʰa/ "womb"	
/k/	/koloi/ "name"	/korou/ "a day"	/yemlak/ "between the house"
/kʰ/	/kʰoiyəm/ "God"	/nəkʰoŋ/ "your leg"	
/d/	/darsan/ "look"	/nadairem/ "your man/servant"	
/dʰ/	/dʰyan/ "meditation"	/radʰa/ "name of person"	
/g/	/gwa/ "betel nut"	/yaŋgoi/ "horse"	
/t/	/taŋja/ "snake"	/nakʰuton/ "your ring finger"	/ihut/ "in place of me"
/tʰ/	/tʰoukaoba/ "to forget your duty"	/niŋtʰi/ "name of river"	
/c/	/coinou/ "Gold"	/pamaca/ "sons of same father"	
/ɟ/	/jagoi/ "dance"	/tʰoujal/ "blessing"	/jubaraj/ "prince"
/m/	/məsabi/ "her husband"	/leima/ "women/queen"	/siŋbum/ "whole day/year"
/n/	/noŋhamba/ "to wait"	/pantʰou/ "father"	/lan/ "war"
/ŋ/	/ŋayokpʰu/ "container keeping fish"	/moŋba/ "human being"	/maləŋ/ "air"
/l/	/laŋmai/ "land of Luwang"	/waŋlen/ "time"	/lahal/ "day before yesterday"
/r/	/ram/ "name of Hindu God Rama"	/məpari/ "his son"	
/s/	/senbi/ "Meetee name of Burma"	/məsiy/ "number"	
/h/	/haorei/ "direction"		
/w/	/waŋlei/ "wine"	/əwaŋba/ "height"	
/y/	/yaipi/ "soul"	/məyim/ "his house"	/məhay/ "fruit"

=== Vowel ===
Phoneme	Initial	Medial	Final
/i/	/ita/ "my friend (female)"	/yimom/ "my daughter"	/pari/ "my son"
/e/		/timen/ "spare"	/tʰoukao e/ "forget his duty"
/a/	/atunoŋki/ "for that day"	/lahan/ "a period of time"	/ita/ "my friend(female)"
/o/	/ondeŋkʰiba/ "to go back"	/kʰoynou/ "my friend(female)"	/ŋak o/ "keep it"
/u/	/uŋoinuŋ/ "in my heart"	/luren/ "head"	/huimu/ "name of a person"
/ə/	/əsaiŋei/ "a period of time"	/nəmda/ "in my back"	/pampə/ "tiger"

== Phonotactics ==
The phonotactic structure of Medieval Meitei exhibits the following constraints:

- All phonemes may occur freely in medial position.
- All vowel phonemes may occur in initial position except /e/, which does not occur word-initially.
- Most consonants may occur in initial position; however, /b/, /d/, /dh/, /g/, and /r/ occur in initial position primarily in loanwords.
- Only a limited set of consonants may occur in final position, namely /p/, /t/, /k/, /m/, /n/, /ŋ/, /l/, and /y/.

== Lexical influences ==
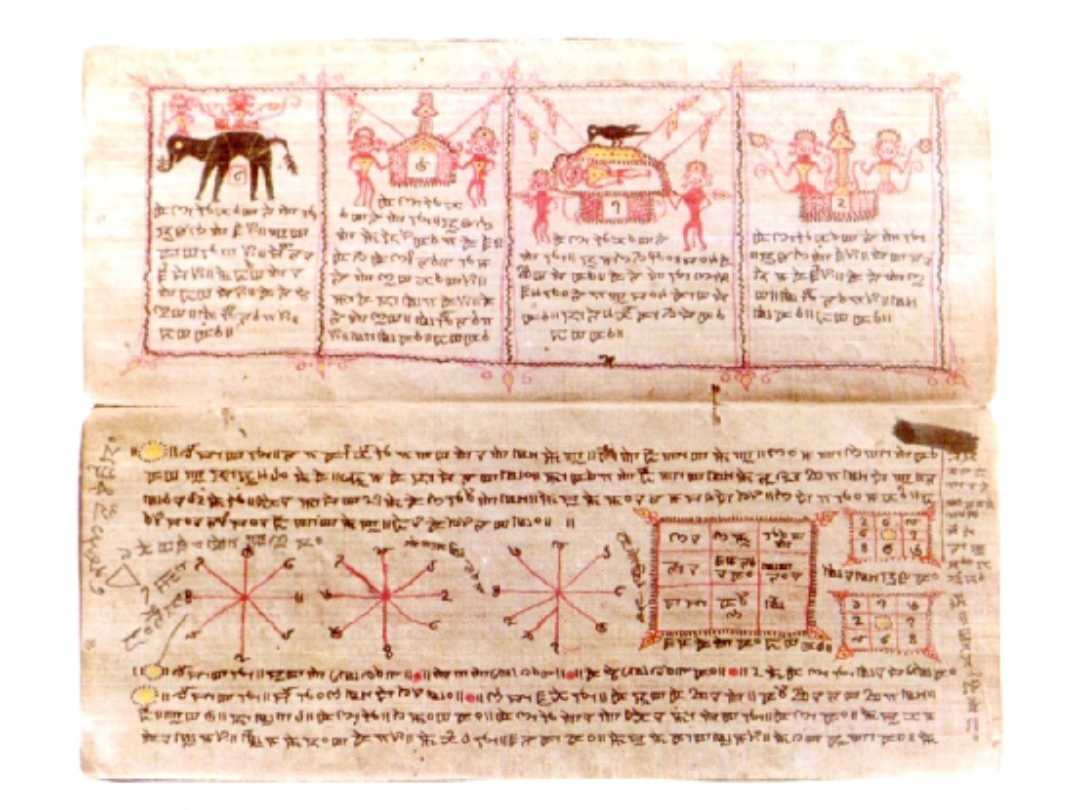
An 18th-19th century Meitei manuscript of the Subika Laisaba theme

Medieval Meitei language is marked by extensive lexical borrowing due to religious and cultural transformation. Sanskrit and Bengali became major sources of loanwords. Religious texts show the highest density of borrowed vocabulary. Indigenous Meitei texts retain a largely native lexicon with minimal external influence. Medieval Meitei language developed a stratified vocabulary system reflecting religious and literary domains.

== See also ==
- State Level Committee for declaration of Manipuri Language as Classical Language of India
- Meitei grammar
- Meitei language in Assam
- Meitei language in Tripura
- Meitei language in Bangladesh
- Meitei language in Myanmar

== Bibliography ==
- Beckwith, Christopher (2002-01-01). Medieval Tibeto-Burman Languages: Proceedings of the Ninth Seminar of the IATS, 2000. Volume 6. BRILL. ISBN 978-90-474-0130-8.
- Kabui, Gangumei (2003). History of Manipur: Pre Colonial Period, Vol. I, National Publishing House, New Delhi.
- Pettigrew, Rev. W. (1912). Manipuri (Meitei) Grammar with Illustrative Sentences, Allahabad.
- Modhubala, P. (2002). Manipuri Phonology, Imphal.
