= Modern Indian Language =

Categorization of languages in India

Modern Indian language (MIL) is a term used in India to denote several Indian languages used in modern times, with or without official status. Though most Modern Indian languages are also mentioned in Eighth Schedule to the Constitution of India, it is not necessary that all languages listed in either of them is listed in other one.

== Languages ==
Modern Indian languages are listed below.

- Assamese
- Bengali
- Boro
- Bhutia
- Gujarati
- Kashmiri
- Kannada
- Lepcha
- Limbu
- Maithili
- Malayalam
- Meitei
- Marathi
- Mizo
- Odia
- Punjabi
- Sanskrit
- Santali
- Sindhi
- Tamil
- Telugu
- Urdu
- Dogri

== Application ==
Most education boards in India teach at least one of the MILs in schools. UPSC requires candidates to be well versed in at least one MIL.

== See also ==
- Less Commonly Taught Languages
