= Digital Library of India =

First Indian national digital library initiative of 2000s

- Website type: Education
- Headquarters: {{{location_country}}}
- Website: dli.ernet.in
- Current status: Inactive

Digital Library of India, initially hosted by Indian Institute of Science, CDAC, Noida, IIIT-Hyderabad during 2000s working in partnership with the Million Book Project, provides free access to many books in English and Indian languages. The scanning of Indian language books has created an opportunity for developing Indian language optical character recognition (OCR) software. The publications are mainly in PDF or QuickTime format.

Because of copyright laws, the texts are all out of copyright and therefore not sources for current information, but rather useful for history and background.

As of 2016, DLI had scanned 550,603 titles.

Representative titles include:

- Ancient India, McCrindle J. W.. 1885.
- Ancient Indian Polity, Aiyangar K. V. Rangaswami. 1935.
- History of the Parsis Vol-I, Karaka Dosabhai Framji. 1884.
- A Treatise on Kala-Azar, Brahmachari Upendranath. 1928.
- "Aligarh kee taleemi tehreek", Khwaja Ghulamus Sayyedain, 1931
- "Makateeb-e-Sanai" by Professor Nazir Ahmed, 1962

Books in Urdu and Persian are also available. Examples include " Aligarh kee taaleemi tehreek" by Khwaja Ghulamus Sayyedain and Makateeb-e-Sanai by Professor Nazir Ahmad

DLI website has not been operational for maintenance reasons from 2017. The contents are available from archive.org

== See also ==
- Traditional Knowledge Digital Library
- Panjab Digital Library
- Partners in Digital Library of India
