= Meitei grammar =

Grammar of the Meitei language

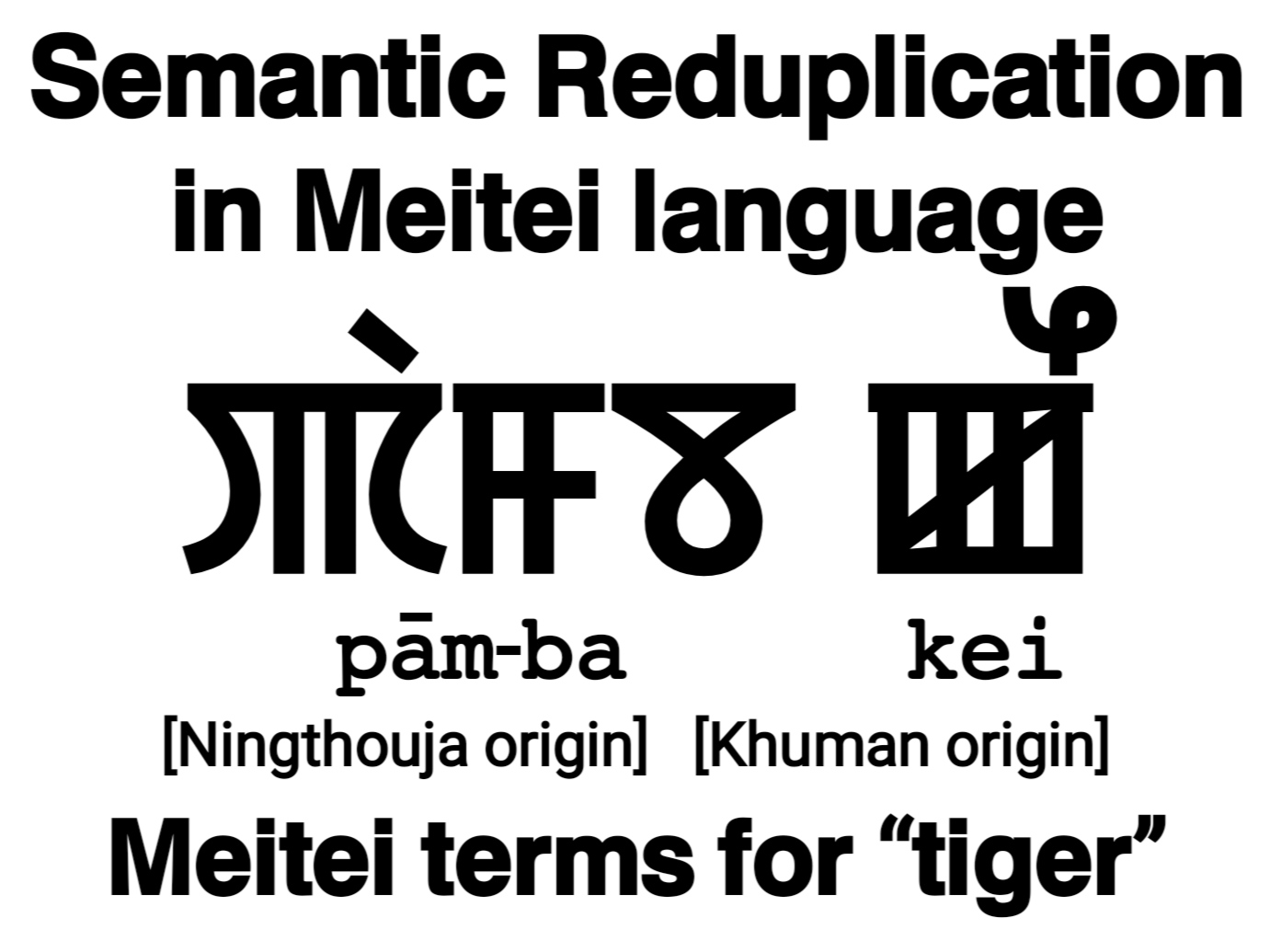
Semantic reduplication in Classical Meitei language word for "Tiger" - combination of words originated from Ningthouja & Khuman linguistic varieties

Meitei grammar (Meitei: Meetei Lonmit), sometimes also known as Manipuri grammar (Meitei: Manipuri Lonmeet), is the whole system and structure of Meitei language (also known as Manipuri), consisting of syntax and morphology (including inflections) and also phonology and semantics.

The Meitei language clearly has characteristics of the Tibeto-Burman language group. These features include three types of velar nasal sounds, many words that sound the same, changes in the meaning of verbs, repeating or expanding words, final particles, a focus on aspect (how an action is happening) instead of tense (when it happens), no gender marking, a verb-final sentence structure, and a system where verbs are formed by adding many suffixes and fewer prefixes.

== Nouns ==
=== Case ===
The declension of nouns is very simple. The terminations are-

Cases	Meitei suffices	Examples	Description
Nominative case	-na	mi-na	a man (mi alone is often used).
Genitive case	-gi	mi-gi	of a man.
Dative case	-da	mi-da (also mingonda*)	to a man.
Accusative case	-bu	mi-bu	a man.
Ablative case	-dagi	mi-dagi (also mingondagi*)	from a man.
Locative case	-da	maphamda	in a place

=== Number ===
The plural in the case of human beings is formed by adding "sing"/"shing" (meitei: -ꯁꯤꯡ) to the word and declining in the same manner as in the singular, as :-

- mising, ꯃꯤꯁꯤꯡ - men.
- Misinggi, ꯃꯤꯁꯤꯡꯒꯤ - of men, etc.

There is no plural form for animals and other things. "Kheibik" and "pumnamak", all, or "yamna", many, are used to indicate plurality.

=== Gender ===
Gender, in the case of animals, is indicated by the addition of "laba" (meitei: ꯂꯥꯕ) for the masculine and "amom" (meitei: ꯑꯃꫭꯝ) for the feminine, as :--

- Sagol laba, ꯁꯒꫭꯜ ꯂꯥꯕ- a stallion.
- Sagol amom, ꯁꯒꫭꯜ ꯑꯃꫭꯝ - a mare.

In the case of human beings, gender is indicated by the addition of "nupa"/"nipa" and "nupi"/"nipi", but only when the same word is used for both male and female, as:-

- macha-nupa, ꯃꯆꯥꯅꯨꯄꯥ - a son.
- macha-nupi, ꯃꯆꯥꯅꯨꯄꯤ - a daughter.

== Pronouns ==
The personal pronouns are :

- "ai"/"ei" or "eihak" - I,
- "nang" or "nahak" - thou/you,
- "ma" or "mahak" - he/she/it.

The form ending in "hak" is honorific. The plural is formed by adding "khoi" to the singular non-honorific form. Pronouns are declined in the same way, as "mi", a man.

=== Singular ===
Case	First person pronouns	Second person pronouns	Third person pronouns
Nominative case	eina	nangna	mâna
Genitive case	eigi	nanggi	magi
Dative case	eingonda	nangonda	mângonda
Accusative case	eibu	nangbu	mâbu.
Ablative case	eigondagi	nangondagi	mangondagi.

=== Plural ===
Case	First person pronouns	Second person pronouns	Third person pronouns
Nominative case	eikhoi	nakhoi	mâkhoi.
Genitive case	eikhoigi	nakhoigi	mâkhoigi.

=== Demonstrative pronouns ===
The demonstrative pronouns are

- asi, or masi - this.
- adu, or madu - that.

"Asi" is also used in the same sense as "adu".

=== Interrogative pronouns ===
The interrogative pronouns are

- kana or kanano - who?
- kadai - what?

=== Relative pronouns ===
Relative pronouns are not used. A verbal participle with "asi" or "adu" is used in the place of relative pronouns, as:

The man who came yesterday leaves to-day = "ngarang lakpa mi adu ngasi chatkani."

== Adjectives ==
All adjectives end in "ba", and an initial "a" may always be prefixed without altering the meaning, as:-

- Good - aphaba, or phaba.
- Large - achauba, or chauba.

Adjectives can be declined like verbs, as :-

It was very good "masi yamna phare," where "phaba" has been changed into "phare" to give the word a past meaning. "Ba" is changed into "bi" in the feminine. Adjectives have no plural form.

== Verbs ==
The conjugation of the Meitei verb is very complex. According to Arthur John Primrose (1888), no language has such a variety of tense forms to express present, past, or future action as found in Meitei language. Most of the varieties have distinct meanings of their own. Every verb has also a negative and interrogative form conjugated in all tenses except the interrogative future like the simple verb. The Meitei linguistic system divides the verb into present, past, and future tenses. They also have an imperative tense form under the present tense forms they classify what in English grammar is called the perfect tense. There are no less than eight different present tense forms with corresponding forms for the past and future tenses.

There is no difference in the terminations of a tense, singular or plural, for the first, second, and third persons except in the imperative, which is irregular.

The subjunctive mood is expressed by a participle ending in "labadi" or "rabadi". The "labadi" is used when the verb root ends in a consonant, "rabadi" when the root ends in vowel.

The rule for the interchange of "l" and "r" is also observed in other tenses, "r" is always used after a vowel, "l" after a consonant.

== Participles ==
The present participle ends in "duna" as:-

- Touduna - doing.

The past participle ends in "khiduna" or "luduna", as:-

- Chatkhiduna - having gone.
- Touruduna - having done.

The future participle ends in "laga" or "raga" as "chatlaga," "touraga."

The participle ending in "lingaida" or "ringaida" means at the time of doing a thing, as "when I was going there I saw him" = "aina asida chatlingaida maboo aina uram-mi."

The participle in "kadabagi" or "nanaba" is used to express a purpose, as, "you make preparations to go" = "nang chatna-naba thourang tou."

Participle in "ringaida" or "lingaida" - at the time of doing a thing.

- At the time of doing - tou-ringaida
- At the time of going - chat-lingaida.

Participle in "gadabagi" (kadabagi) or "nanaba" - in order to do a thing.

- I am arranging to do it - ei tou-gadabagi thourang touri
- I am arranging to go - ei chat-kadabagi (chat-nanaba) thourang touri.

Participle in "rabadi" or "labadi" - if I do a thing.

- If you do it - tou-rabadi
- I shall go - eina chat-kani
- If I go - eina chat-labadi
- I will tell him - eina mangonda haigani

Participle in "banina" or "panina" - because.

- Because I did it he is pleased - eina toura-banina ma nungaire.
- Because I went he was angry - eina chat-panina ma saore.

Participle in "gadaba" - must do a thing.

Verbal noun in "bani" or "pani".

- The man who does - tou-bani.
- The man who goes - chat-pani.
- The man who did - tou-khrabani.
- The man who went - chat-kadabani
- The man who shall do - tou-gadabani.
- The man who shall go - chat-kadabani.

These verbal nouns can be used in the different tense forms, but the three forms given above are in general use, the other forms are rarely used.

In sentences such as the following: "the work which is being done is good," "the work which has been done is good," the passive tense forms are expressed by participle forms preceding the noun to which they are related, as,

- the work which is being done is good - "touriba thabak adu fei;"
- "the work which has been done is good" - "toukhriba thabak adu fei."

After words like "kari" (what), "karam" (why), and other interrogative adverbs, a form is used ending in "page" or "bage", for example,

- "what are you doing?" - "nang kari touriage?"
- "How did you go?" - "nang karam chat-lubage?"

== Negative and Interrogative forms ==
Each of the eight forms for the present and past tenses have corresponding negative and interrogative forms. There is only one future negative and interrogative form. It is unnecessary to give all the different negative and interrogative forms for the present and past tenses as only two or three forms are in general use. The conjugation of the verbs "touba" and "chatpa" in their negative and interrogative forms is given below:

=== Negative Conjugation ===
Present tense (to do)	Present tense (to go)
Touroi, toude	chat-loi.
Touramde	chat-lammoi.
Past tense (to do)	Past tense (to go)
Toudre, tourudre	chatte, chatlam-dre
Touramdre	chat-ludre.
Future tense (to do)	Future tense (to go)
Touraroi	chat-laroi

=== Interrogative Conjugation ===
Present tense (to do)	Present tense (to go)
Toubra, toura-bra	chatlibra, chat-pra
chatloidra, chat-tabra	Toudabra, toudrabra
Past tense (to do)	Past tense (to go)
Tourabra, tou-rambra	chatlurabra, chat-lambra.
Tourudabra, touramdra	chatludra, chatlamdra.
Future tense (to do)	Future tense (to go)
Tougera, Tougadra	chat-kera, chat-kadra

== Adverbs ==
English adverbs	Meitei equivalents
Again Alike Already Also	Amuk. Amattâni. Houjik. Adusung.
Always Apart Backwards Below Before Behind Daily Downwards Early Elsewhere Hence Here Hitherto How Immediately Like Little Monthly Much Namely Never Nearly No Now Often Once Out Opposite Only Perhaps Probably Quickly Since Soon Sometimes	Mahousâ (leikhûk). Tôpna (tôngngânna). Tungdâ. Makhada. Mamângdâ (hânna). Matungdâ. Numit khuding. Kumthabada. Nganna. Mapham amada. Asômdagi. Asida. Houjik phâoba. Karamna. Houjik mak. Mannana. Khajikta. Thakudingda. Yamna. Adumak. Khaknattabâ. Kharanangairê. Natte (mai). Houjik. Hanna hanna. Amarak. Mapân. Mâiyôk nana. Makta. Karigumba. Wôiba mâllê. Thûnâ. Asidaraktagî. Kharleiraga. Karikarigumbada.
Somewhere Then There Thus Together Unless Until Upwards Very When? Well Whence Whence? Where? Where Why? Yes Yearly	Karigumba mapham-da. Mâduda. Madarakta. Maram asidaraktagî. Lôinana. Nattarabadi. Adupkimakhai. Mathak lõmda. Yamna. Kadaungei. Phai. Adudagi. Kadaidagi? Kadai? Aduda? Kari? Hôi. Chahi khuding.

== Prepositions ==
English prepositions	Meitei equivalents
According to Above After Among At Before Behind Below Beside Between For From In, Into Of On Out	Matunginna. Mathakta. Matungda. Marakta. Da (affix). Mamangda. Matungda. Makhada. Manakta. Marakta. Damak. Dagi (affix). Manungda. Gi (affix). Thakta. Mapândâ
To Till With Without	Youba. Phâoba. Lôinana. Nattana.

== Conjunctions ==
English conjunctions	Meitei equivalents
Although And As so Because But Else For However If Likewise Or Wherefore Yet	Tinnaba hâiba. Haibabu. Amasung. Adum adumnâ. Karamnâ. Tauigumbasung. Nattarabadi. Karamna, maramna. Adumakpu. Adumna, badi. Su, adumna (suffix). Wairabasung. Aduna. Tauigumbasung.

== See also ==
- Meitei literature
- Meitei proverbs

== Bibliography ==
- A Grammar of Meithei, By Shobhana Lakshmi Chelliah · 2011
- Manipuri Grammar, By Chungkham Yashwanta Singh · 2000
- Manipuri grammar, By D. N. Shankara Bhat, M. S. Ningomba · 1997
- Manipuri Grammar, By Nand Lal Sharma · 1987
- Reciprocal Constructions in Meitei and Nyishi
