= Maibaron =

Traditional Meitei medicine

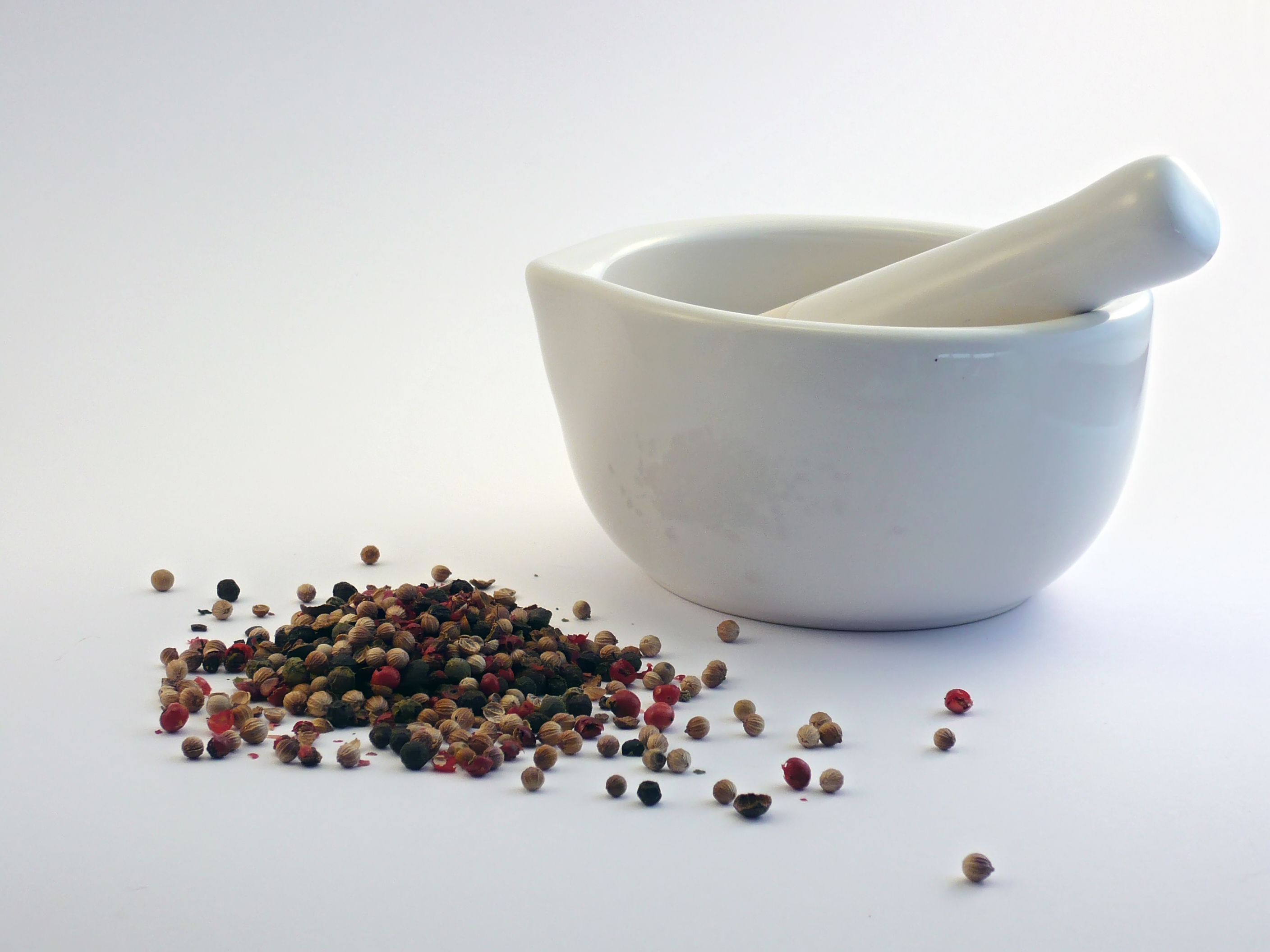
Pestle and mortar, during the preparation of a medicine

Maibarol (ꯃꯥꯏꯕꯔꯣꯜ), also known as Maibaron (ꯃꯥꯏꯕꯔꯣꯟ), is a traditional Meitei language term that refers to the art and science of therapeutic practice. It includes a variety of healing methods such as spiritual rituals, herbal medicine, pulse diagnosis, and even crude surgical techniques of Meitei civilization. Practitioners of this ancient medical system were known as Maiba (male) and Maibi (female), but in earlier times they were also called Ametpa, which literally means "masseur" but colloquially means "therapist."

== Background ==
The organized institution for therapeutic practice in Manipur was called Ametpa Loishang (ꯑꯃꯦꯠꯄ ꯂꯣꯏꯁꯪ), tracing back its origin from the time of King Nongda Lairen Pakhangba (ꯅꯣꯡꯗꯥ ꯂꯥꯏꯔꯦꯟ ꯄꯥꯈꯪꯕ), in 33 CE. According to royal chronicles, the Ametpa Loishang was officially, formally and systematically established around 1570 C.E. during the monarchical rule of Manipur. It functioned as the administrative and medical authority responsible for health and healing practices within the kingdom.

Over time, the methods of healing used by Ametpa Loishang evolved. Initially, diseases were treated using hymns, charms, and spells, similar to exorcism practices. Later, the practitioners used herbal medicines and natural remedies. They began performing basic surgical procedures to address more serious health conditions.

== Cases and records ==
=== Use of surgical therapy ===
One notable record from the royal chronicle dates to June 19, 1870 C.E. (Saka 1792). It tells about the case of a woman who died due to an abortion performed by a female abortionist. After her death, officials from the Ametpa Loishang investigated the matter to determine the cause and responsibility. They were unable to find conclusive results until a surgical procedure confirmed that the woman had indeed been pregnant. This case shows that surgical techniques were practiced and documented in Manipur during the 19th century.

== International recognition ==
The expertise of Meitei therapeutic practitioners was given recognition beyond the region. One recorded incident from May 1848 C.E. (Saka 1770) states that the Ahom king (from present-day Assam) was suffering from a serious illness that doctors from various regions failed to cure. Upon hearing of the skilled healers in Manipur, he requested help. A practitioner named Langoijamba Hema Singh was sent to the Ahom court, where he successfully treated the king over a period of six months.

Even earlier, Sao-Ngan-Pha, a Pong king (contemporary to King Ningthoukhomba of Manipur, 1432–1467 A.D.), also visited Manipur for treatment. After being healed, he offered gifts of gold and silver to the Meitei king in gratitude.

== Methods and techniques ==
The Maibaron system included a wide range of diagnostic and treatment methods, such as pulse diagnosis of feeling and interpreting different types of pulse rhythms, case analysis on taking detailed histories of symptoms before treatment, spiritual rituals, including chanting and offerings for healing, medicinal prescriptions, using herbs and natural ingredients, surgery, in rare but documented cases, basic surgical techniques were performed, follow-up care: Practitioners monitored patients' progress through regular visits.

== Legacy ==
Maibarol is a holistic system of traditional Meitei medicine in Manipur, whose knowledge and practices of the Ametpa Loishang contributed to both community health and the cultural heritage of the Meitei people. Though modern medicine has replaced many traditional methods, the Maiba-Maibi system remains a respected part of Meitei identity and history.

== See also ==
- Plants in Meitei civilisation
- Ancient Meitei hymns
- Meitei ritual songs
- Yumsharol
- Meitei astronomy
