= Hidaklon =

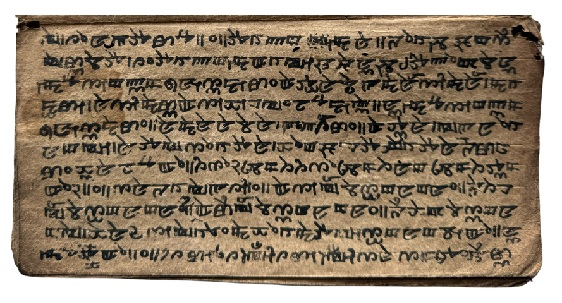
Hidaklon manuscript text in Ancient Meitei language in Meetei Mayek script

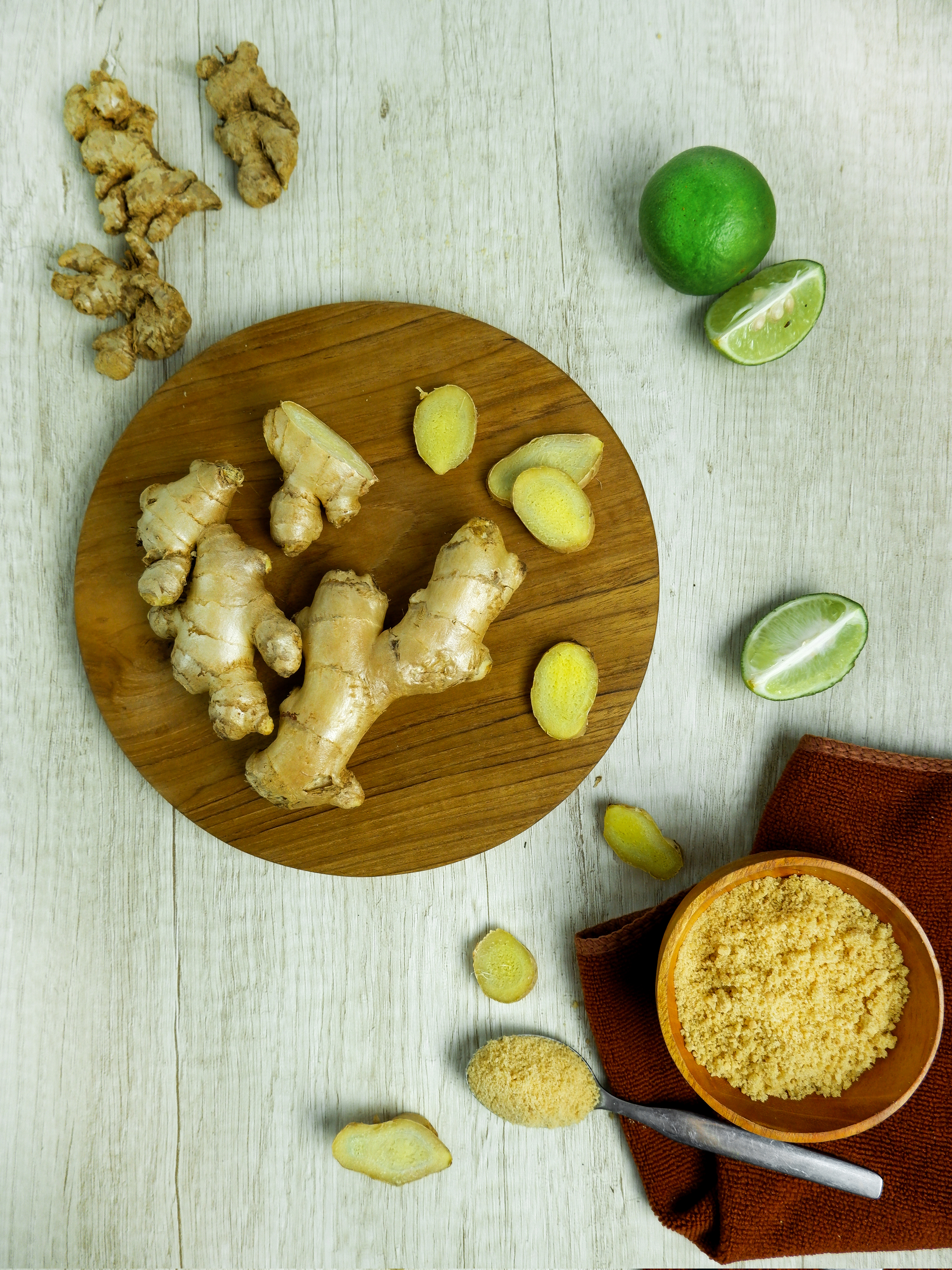
Ginger (Meitei: Sing/Shing) is used to treat cold (Meitei: Lok) and cough (Meitei: Lok Khuba) according to the Hidaklon medicine tradition

Hidaklon (ꯍꯤꯗꯥꯛꯂꯣꯟ; from Hidak meaning "medicine" and Lon meaning "science" or "treatise") refers to the traditional Meitei science of medicine and healing. It includes the knowledge and use of medicinal plants, animals, and minerals for therapeutic purposes.

It provides detailed instructions on proportions and dosages of various natural materials used in the medicine of Meitei civilization of Ancient Kangleipak (early Manipur). These practices have played a significant role in protecting the Meitei people from diseases and epidemics throughout history.

A detailed system of Hidaklon folk medicine is documented in a compilation of five volumes. Certain rituals involve the offering of seven types of flowers and seven types of fruits to deities. Many of the plants used in these rituals have been identified as having medicinal properties. Some are used as ritual offerings to gods and ancestors, while others serve purposes such as being made into rosaries believed to offer protection, or being burned as fumigants to repel malevolent spirits. While some practices are rooted in religious or cultural beliefs, the plants are also employed for their medicinal uses.

== Overview ==
Hidaklon includes detailed information on the preparation, usage, and dosages of natural remedies derived from flora, fauna, and minerals. The practices described in Hidaklon show notable similarities to other traditional medicine disciplines, particularly in their methods of formulation and administration.

A distinctive feature of Meitei traditional medicine is the incorporation of spells and incantations as part of the healing process. These are commonly used alongside physical treatments.

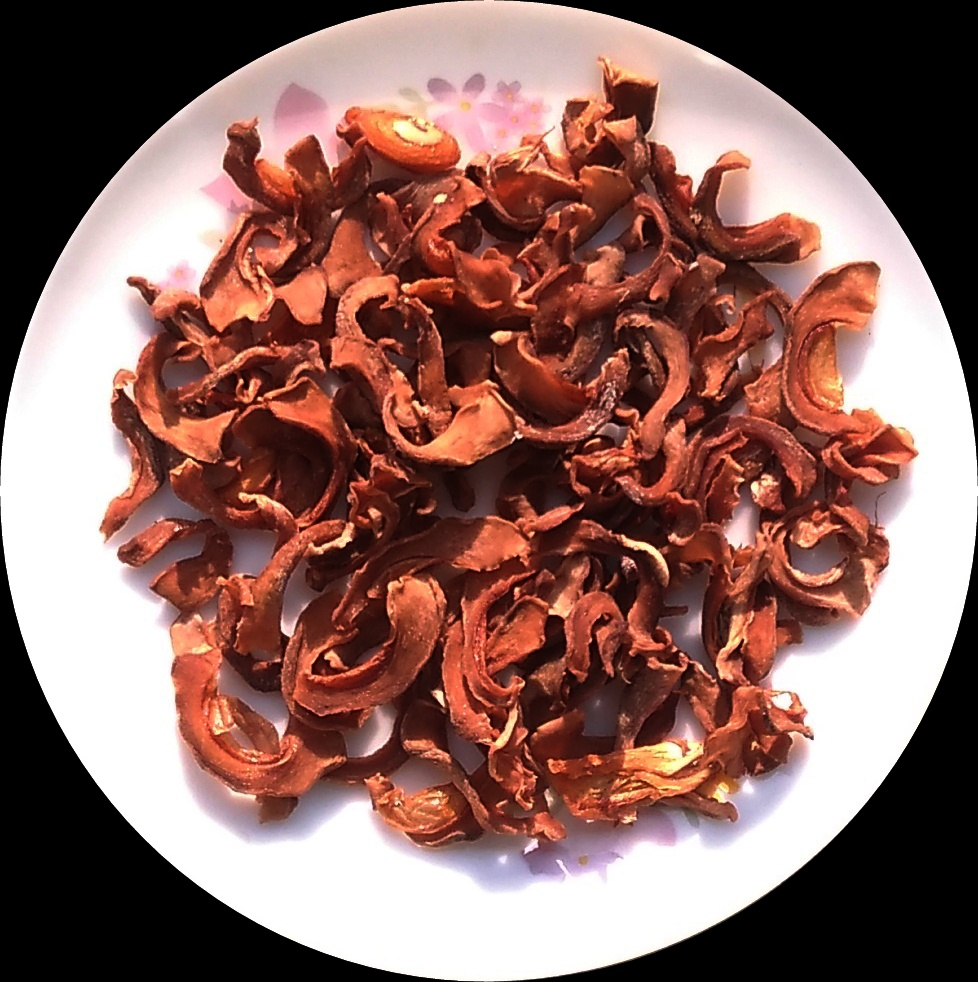
Garcinia (Meitei: Heibung) is used to treat burns on skin, caused by fire, in the Hidaklon medicine tradition

== Composition and practice ==
Medicinal substances are typically used in natural or dietary-compatible forms, meaning they do not require additional vitamin supplementation to maintain health. Treatments are designed to minimize side effects while promoting overall well-being.

One example from a traditional Meitei manuscript includes the treatment for leprosy:

Original Verse

Ahoraiki Hitakti // Mapatta Sutuna Thak-o // Lailen Masingkhane // Nungsilne Thak-o

Translation

Dry gall bladder of a python and alum mixed in water are administered orally to treat leprosy.

According to Hidaklon Puya, different wild edible plants were used to treat different illnesses. However, many people have stopped using traditional remedies because wild edible and medicinal plants are becoming harder to find. Some of these plants no longer grow in the wild and are now grown in home gardens and farms. Once these plants are grown in gardens or farms, they are no longer called wild plants, they become domesticated crops. In Manipur, many plants that had disappeared from the wild are now being grown and used as farm crops because they are still needed and their prices have gone up.

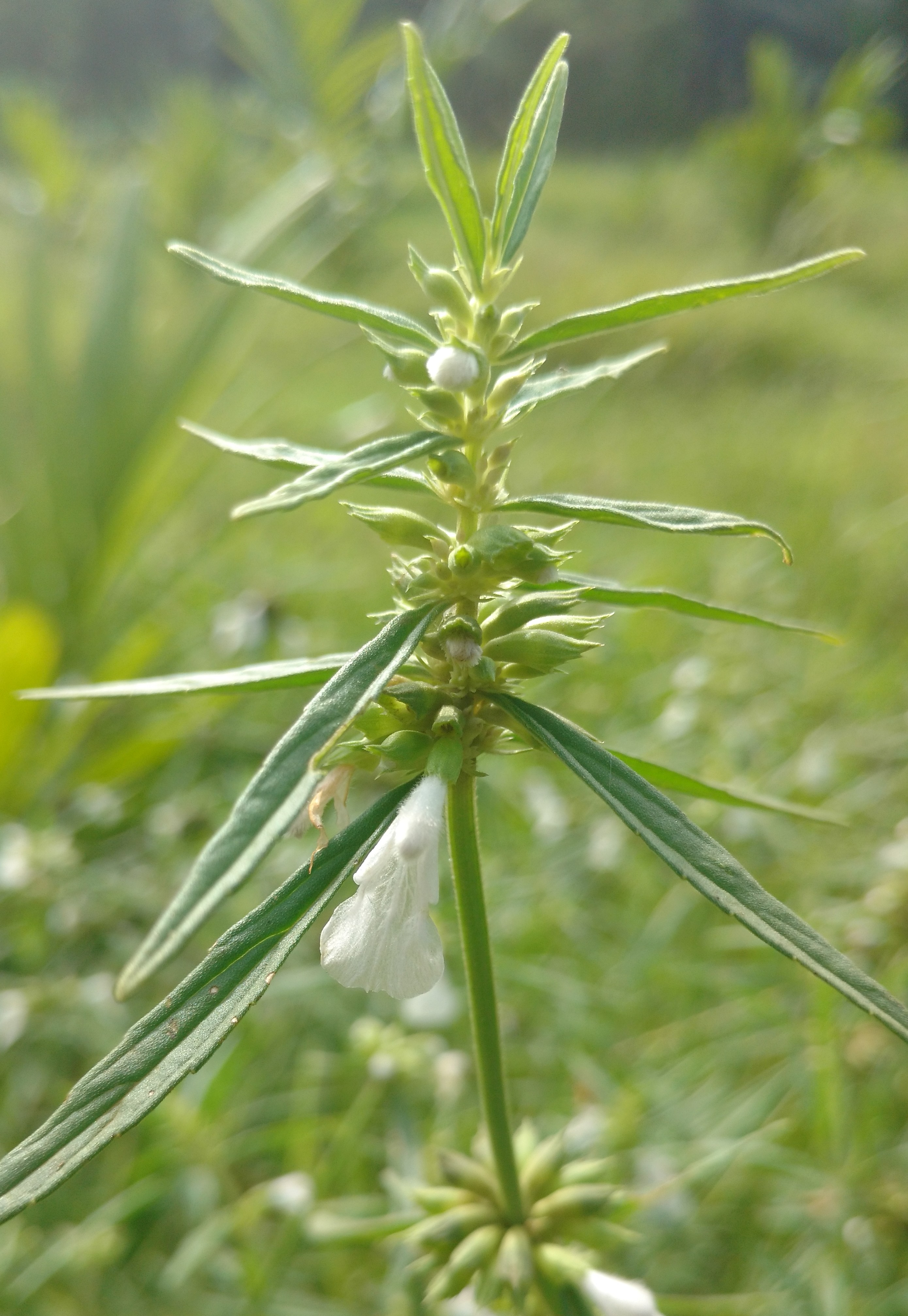
Thumba plant (Meitei: Mayang Lembung/Mayang Lembum) is used as one of the medicines for the treatment of snakebite in the Hidaklon medicine tradition

== Struggles with recognition ==
The traditional healthcare system in Manipur was mainly practiced by Maibas and Maibis, traditional male and female healers. According to the Apunba Imagi Machasing (AIMS), the use of medicinal plants to treat basic health problems has existed since prehistoric times. AIMS stated that this knowledge was recorded in ancient manuscripts called the Hidaklon, which consisted of five volumes detailing traditional healing methods, including reflexology and ritual practices. AIMS expressed concern that this system was fading and urged the government to establish a National Manipuri Traditional Medicine and Research Institute to preserve and promote this heritage.

== See also ==
- Maiba
- Yumsharol
- Meitei astronomy
