= Mizoram Board of School Education =

Governmental body for academic administration in Mizoram, India

- Abbreviation: MBSE
- Formation: 1975
- Type: Governmental Board of School Education
- Headquarters: Aizawl, Mizoram, India
- Official language: English and Mizo
- Chairman: J H Zoremthanga
- Website: Official website

The Mizoram Board of School Education (MBSE) is an autonomous governmental body for academic administration in Mizoram, India, having its jurisdiction from elementary to higher secondary education. It was established by the Government of Mizoram (then the Union Territory of India) in 1975 by the Mizoram Board of School Education Act. It has the power to regulate, supervise and control school education in Mizoram. Its primary function is to prepare academic programmes and organise examinations, especially for state level High School Leaving Certificate (HSLC) and Higher Secondary School Leaving Certificate (HSSLC). From 2012, the board also conducts State Technical Entrance Examination (STEE) for entry into technical courses such as engineering, medicine, veterinary science, pharmacy, nursing, homoeopathy, and dentistry.

In March 2012, Rev Dr Lalchungnunga, a retired principal of Serampore College, became the chairman.

== History ==
The Mizoram Board of School Education was established in 1975 by the MBSE Act. The act was approved by the Legislative Assembly of the Mizoram Union Territory, at that time the administrative head was the Chief Executive Member Ch. Chhunga. The board as an autonomous authority in education started functioning on 2 December 1976.

== The board ==
According to the MBSE (Second Amendment) Act 2008, the governing board consists of:

- The chairman, who is the chairman of MBSE
- Member secretary, who is the state Secretary of education
- Director of Higher and Technical Education
- Director of Art and Culture
- Director of Sports and Youth Services
- Director of Agriculture
- Director of Health Services
- Engineer-in-chief, Public Works Department
- Joint director, SCERT
- One principal of a college in Mizoram
- Principal, College of Teachers' Education
- One principal from District Institute of Education & Training
- One district education officer
- Registrar, Mizoram University

In addition members are appointed from any principal of higher secondary school, headmaster of high school, headmaster of middle school, representative of each district council, one Member of Legislative Assembly, and one female educationist.

== Function ==
The most important functions of MBSE are:

- it provides recognition to schools and institutes, and also monitors their administrative work
- it maintain quality education by prescribing curricular structure and recommending textbooks
- it takes the responsibility of conducting exams and publishes results
- it maintains co-ordination with the state government for any educational matters
- it motivates students and as well as teachers by conducting interactive programs
- it prescribes syllabus for its regular and vocational courses
- it regulates examinations for both regular and private candidates
