= Meitei philosophy =

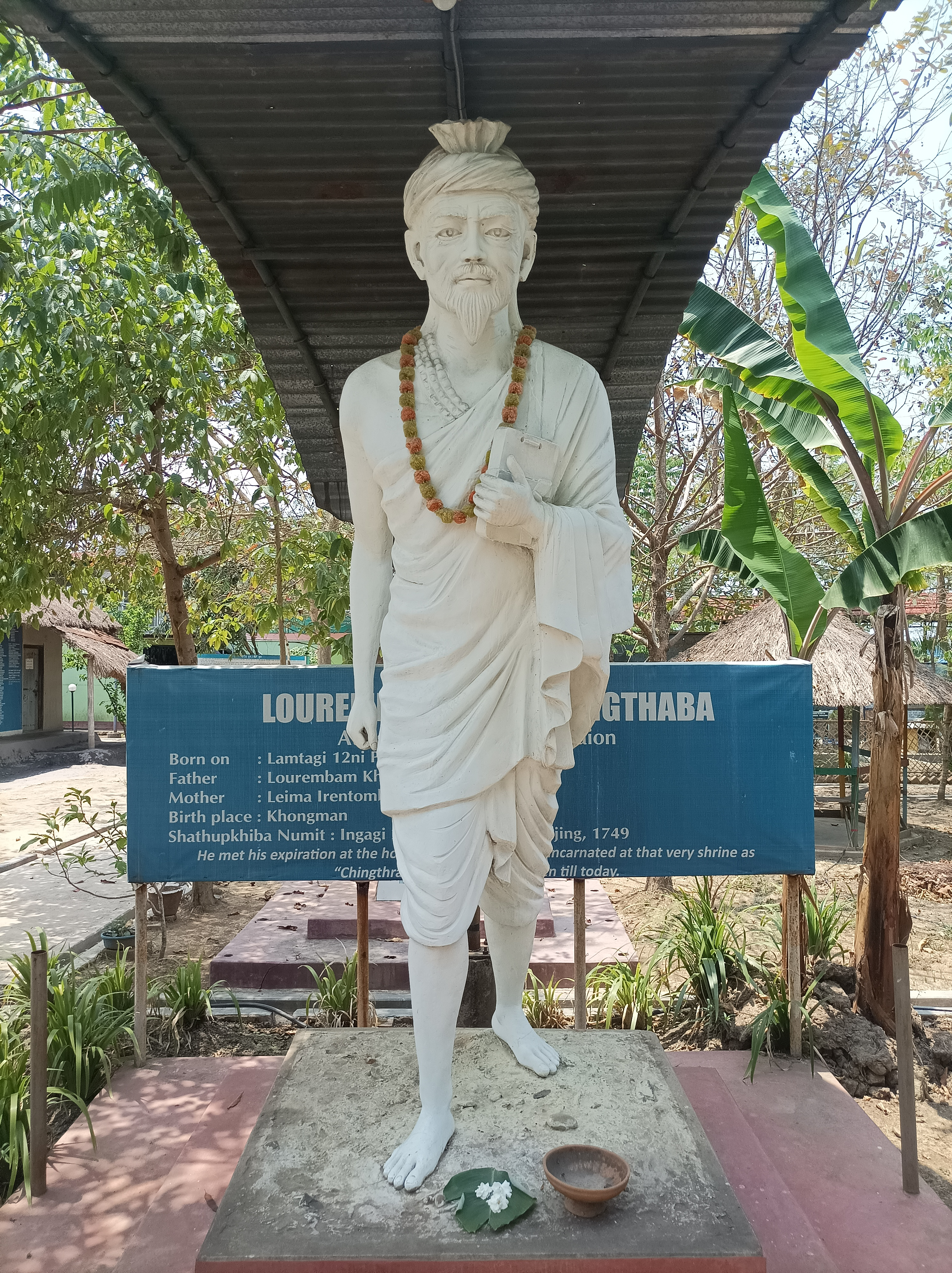
Lourembam Khongnangthaba, a Meitei high priest (Maichou) & philosopher

The Meitei philosophy (ꯃꯩꯇꯩ ꯋꯥꯡꯎꯂꯣꯟ) or Meetei philosophy (ꯃꯤꯇꯩ ꯋꯥꯡꯎꯂꯣꯜ) refers to the philosophical traditions of the Meitei civilisation of Ancient Kangleipak (early Manipur). The philosophical norms are inscribed in the massive materials of many ancient Meitei chronicles. Meitei philosophy is also expressed through classical Meitei proverbs, maxims, songs, and traditional explanations. These materials show serious philosophical thinking about human life, ethics, society, nature, religion, and the future of the land. The philosophy reflects a strong concern for the well-being of people and for harmony between humans, nature, and the spiritual world. Rather than abstract speculation, Meitei philosophy uses everyday experience and simple language to convey its ideas.

Meitei philosophy is a practical and experience-based system of thought expressed through simple language and familiar images. It offers guidance on living with balance, humility, responsibility, and awareness of consequences. Its teachings connect personal conduct with social order, spiritual belief, and care for the land. By preserving memory, respecting elders, and maintaining harmony with nature, Meitei philosophy presents a vision of continuity between past, present, and future.

== Sources and expression ==
The philosophical ideas are preserved in collections of sayings and in textual and oral traditions. These sayings use repetition, rhyme, and metaphor to express meaning and, at times, to conceal sensitive ideas. Knowledge is passed down through proverbs, folk songs, children’s rhymes, stories, ritual language, and commentary by elders. The form of expression is simple, but the meanings are often layered and symbolic.

== Concept of life and time ==
Life in Meitei philosophy is understood as a journey that must be lived in proper sequence. Human life is divided into stages such as childhood, youth, and old age, and each stage has its own duties. Time is seen as irreversible and unstoppable. Teachings warn that excessive attachment to the past or anxiety about the future causes people to lose the present. Birth and death are treated as natural processes, and the human body is understood as something borrowed for a limited time and later returned.

== Ethics and conduct ==
Ethical teachings form a central part of Meitei philosophy. Many sayings emphasize restraint, fairness, and responsibility. Taking only what is rightfully given leads to growth and stability, while forceful taking results in destruction. Anger and hatred are compared to heat that is difficult to cool once it enters the heart. Pretending to have knowledge without understanding is seen as harmful to society. True character is believed to be unchangeable by outward imitation, and actions are understood to have consequences that return to the doer.

== Knowledge and wisdom ==
A clear distinction is made between knowledge and ability. Knowledge can be taught and repeated, but ability is partly innate and cannot always be transferred by instruction. Reading and learning provide names and ideas, but practical understanding and lived experience protect the land and society. Elders are valued as sources of wisdom because they have lived through past events and understand their outcomes. Those who refuse to listen to advice are compared to people who appear awake but are not truly receptive.

== Society and leadership ==
Meitei philosophy frequently reflects on social order and leadership. Kings and leaders are expected to act with wisdom, restraint, and concern for the people. Power without understanding is considered dangerous and temporary. Advisors and scholars play an important role, as they can guide or mislead rulers through their counsel. Justice is believed to be best delivered by those who know the people and their circumstances rather than by distant or impersonal authority.

== Relationship with nature ==
Nature holds a central place in Meitei philosophical thought. Mountains, lakes, rivers, forests, plants, and animals are treated as teachers and moral guides. The land is sustained by natural balance, and disturbing this balance leads to suffering and disorder. Agricultural life provides many metaphors for patience, effort, sharing, and reward. Plants and medicinal herbs are understood through observation and experience rather than abstraction. Humans are viewed as part of nature, not separate from it.

== Spiritual thought and religion ==
Spiritual belief is closely tied to everyday life and survival. Unlike animals, humans are considered weak and dependent and therefore in need of divine presence and protection. Sacred spaces are to be respected, and neglect of traditional belief is often described as leading to social and moral decline. Indigenous religious practices are presented as closely connected to the land, ancestry, and continuity of the people. Religious change and foreign influence are often discussed through indirect language and metaphor.

== Community and human relations ==
Human relationships are explained through familiar images drawn from household life, food sharing, farming, and neighborhood relations. Harmony depends on gentle speech and thoughtful action, while harsh words can destroy bonds. Cooperation and mutual support are presented as necessary for survival. Community discussion is valued because it exposes false ideas and brings clarity. Good relations with those nearby are often considered more useful than distant ties.

== Preservation of land and tradition ==
A strong concern throughout Meitei philosophy is the preservation of the land, culture, and ancestral knowledge. Teachings stress that what is protected will survive and what survives will continue to create. Knowledge is compared to seeds and tubers that must be planted and cared for in order to bear fruit later. The land is frequently described as a mother, and harming it is equated with harming oneself. Forgetting tradition is associated with loss of identity and future insecurity.

== See also ==
- Ancient Meitei literature
- Ancient Meitei religion
- Ancient Meitei hymns
- Meitei ritual songs
- Meitei confederacy
- Yek Salai
- Meitei mythology
- Meitei folklore
- Meitei folktales

== Bibliography ==
- Sanajaoba, Naorem (1988). Manipur, Past and Present: The Heritage and Ordeals of a Civilization. ISBN 9788170998532.
- Meitei, Sanjenbam Yaiphaba; Chaudhuri, Sarit K.; Arunkumar, M. C. (25 November 2020). The Cultural Heritage of Manipur. ISBN 9781000296372.
