= Meitei proverbs =

Meitei language sayings

Proverbs (Meitei: Paorou, lit. 'information‑to take') in Meitei language (officially called Manipuri language) are usually short, well-known terse and vigorously expressive sayings, stating general truths as well as advices. These are the intangible cultural heritages of Meitei civilization, playing crucial roles in the classicism in Meitei culture.

== List ==
=== General ===
Meitei language proverbs			English language translations	Applications (if any)	English equivalents (if any)	Note(s)
In Meitei script	In Eastern Nagari script	In Romanization	English language translations	Applications (if any)	English equivalents (if any)	Note(s)
ꯀꯩꯅꯕꯨ ꯇꯣꯛꯄ ꯄꯣꯛꯄꯔꯥ?	কৈনবু তোকপা পোকপরা?	Kei na bu tokpa pokpara?	Will a tiger give birth to a cat?			
ꯏꯔꯨꯅꯤꯡꯕꯒ ꯊꯣꯡꯇꯦꯛꯄꯒ ꯃꯥꯟꯅꯕꯒꯨꯝ	ইরুনিঙবগা থোংতেকপগা মান্নবগুম	Iruningbaga thongtekpaga manabagum	A man who wants to wash, gains his end when the bridge breaks.	A man may sometimes get what he wants by an accident.		
ꯊꯧ ꯃꯄꯥꯌꯦꯡꯅ ꯈꯨꯗꯣꯞ ꯁꯤꯕꯒꯨꯝ	থৌ মপায়েংনা খুদোপ সিবগুম	Thau mapayengna khudop sibagum	Wear the ring which suits your business.		Cut your coat according to your cloth.	
ꯂꯦꯞꯅꯦꯝꯕꯅ ꯊꯥ ꯂꯥꯝꯕꯒꯨꯝ	লেপনেম্বনা থা লাম্বগুম	Lepnembana tha lambagum	A short man tries to reach the Moon.	It applies to an over ambitious man.		
ꯃꯦꯔꯨꯛꯇ ꯃꯅꯥ ꯄꯥꯟꯕꯒꯨꯝ	মেরুক্তা মনা পানবগুম	Merukta mana panbagum	It is like putting a handle to a light measure.	It applies to anyone doing a useless action.		The meruk is a measure weighing about 10 chittacks, for which no handle is necessary.
ꯑꯃꯝꯕꯗ ꯈꯨꯗꯨꯝ ꯎꯠꯄꯒꯨꯝ	অমন্বদা খুছম উৎপগুম	Amambada khudum utpagum.	It is like showing your fist in the dark.	It replies to a coward.		
ꯏꯔꯣꯏ ꯃꯆꯤꯗ ꯊꯣꯏꯗꯤꯡ ꯊꯝꯕꯒꯨꯝ	ইরোই মচিদা থোইদিং থম্বগুম	Iroi machida thoiding thambagum	You might as well put a small oilseed on the horns of a buffalo.	It applies to any impossible action.		
ꯑꯃꯝꯕꯗ ꯄꯣꯠ ꯃꯥꯕꯒꯨꯝ	অমম্বদা পোৎ মাবগুম	Amambada pot mabagum	You are like the man who gropes for a thing in the dark.	It applies to any one undertaking what he cannot perform.		
ꯑꯉꯥꯡ ꯃꯆꯥꯅ ꯂꯥꯏꯁꯥꯟꯅꯕꯒꯨꯝ	অঙাং মচ্চানা লাঈসান্নবগুম	Angang machana laisannabagum	You act like children playing with dolls.	It applies to persons who trifle with important business.		
ꯃꯤꯠꯇꯥꯡꯕꯅ ꯃꯤꯡꯁꯦꯟ ꯌꯦꯡꯕꯒꯨꯝ	মিৎতাঙবনা মিঙসেন য়েঙবগুম	Mittangbana mingsen yengbagum	Show a looking-glass to a blind man.	It applies to a person who pretends to understand something which he is ignorant of.		
ꯂꯝꯕꯣꯏꯕꯗ ꯁꯝꯖꯦꯠ ꯄꯤꯕꯒꯨꯝ	লমবোইবদা সমজেৎ পিবগুম	Lamboibada samjet pibagum	Give a comb to a saint (who is bald).	It applies to a person giving an inappropriate present.		
ꯀꯨꯝꯃꯩ ꯂꯣꯏꯔꯒ ꯊꯥꯎꯃꯩ ꯊꯥꯟꯒꯠꯄꯒꯨꯝ	কুমৈ লোইরগা থাওমৈ থানগৎপগুম	Kumei loiraga thaomei thangatpagum	You light the lamps when the meeting is over.	It applies to any one who does not act in time.	Lock the stable door when the horse is out.	
ꯍꯨꯔꯥꯟꯕ ꯃꯇꯨꯡꯗ ꯃꯩꯔꯤꯕꯒꯨꯝ	হুরানবা মত্তুংদা মৈরিংবগুম	Huranba mattungda meiringbagum.	You keep watch after the thief has carried off your property.			
ꯌꯩꯅꯕ ꯃꯇꯨꯡꯗ ꯄꯥꯝꯕꯣꯝ ꯇꯤꯡꯕꯒꯨꯝ	য়ৈনবা মত্তংদা পামবোম তিংবগুম	Yeinaba mattungda pambom tingbagum	You show fight after receiving a caning.			
ꯁꯥꯃꯨ ꯃꯆꯥꯅ ꯊꯧꯔꯤ ꯈꯪꯗꯕꯒꯨꯝ	সামু মচ্চানা থৌরি খঙদবগুম	Samu machana thauri khangdabagum	A young elephant does not understand the rope.	It applies to giving any one a task which he cannot perform.		
ꯂꯥꯏꯔꯕꯅ ꯌꯦꯜꯂꯣꯏꯕ ꯋꯥꯕ ꯑꯣꯟꯕꯒꯨꯝ	লাইরবনা য়েল্লোইবা ৱাবা ওনবগুম	Lairabana yelloiba waba onbagum	Like the poor man's last fowl which has taken to the forests.	It applies to the loss of anything greatly valued by owner.		
ꯆꯤꯟꯊꯤꯕꯅ ꯂꯧꯁꯤꯡ ꯁꯥꯕꯒꯨꯝ	চিনথিবনা লৌসিং সাবগুম	Chinthibana lausing sabagum	Does a prater merely by talking create wisdom? (Talking does not make a wise man)			
ꯂꯤꯟꯅ ꯃꯈꯨꯟ ꯆꯪꯂꯝꯗꯥꯏꯗ ꯆꯨꯝꯕꯒꯨꯝ	লিন্না মখুন চঙলমদাঈদা চুম্বগুম	Linna makhun changlamdaida chumbagum	A snake goes straight into its hole.		Don't beat about the bush.	
ꯉꯥꯄ꯭ꯔꯨꯝ ꯃꯈꯨꯟꯗ ꯉꯥꯄ꯭ꯔꯨꯝ ꯊꯥꯖꯤꯟꯕꯒꯨꯝ	ঙাপ্রুম মখুন্দা ঙাপ্রুম থাজিনবগুম	Ngaprum makhunda ngaprum thajinbagum	Send an eel into another eel's hole.		Set a thief to catch a thief.	
ꯍꯧꯗꯣꯡ ꯃꯃꯩꯗ ꯈꯨꯔꯦꯟ ꯈꯨꯕꯒꯨꯝ	হৌদোঙ মমৈদা খুরেন খূবগুম	Haudong mameida khuren khubagum	You might as well put a ring on a cat's tail.	It applies to a person who attempts an impossible action.		
ꯀꯩ ꯃꯌꯥꯗ ꯁꯥꯗꯨꯝ ꯍꯨꯟꯖꯤꯟꯕꯒꯨꯝ	কৈ ময়াদা সাদুম হুনজিনবগুম	Kei mayada sadum hunjinbagum	You are throwing flesh into the tiger's mouth.	It applies to a person who trusts a dishonest person with his property.		
ꯂꯩꯈꯣꯝ ꯃꯔꯛꯇ ꯊꯝꯕꯥꯟ ꯁꯥꯠꯄꯒꯨꯝ	লৈখোম মরক্তা থম্বান সাৎপগুম	Leikhom marakta thamban satpagum	The lotus flowers in the middle of the mud.	It applies to anyone who from a low origin rises to eminence.		
ꯑꯀꯣꯛꯄꯗ ꯂꯝꯃꯥꯡꯅꯕꯒꯨꯝ	অকোকপদা লম্মাঙনবগুম	Akokpada lammangnabagum	You are like the man who loses his way in an open place.	It applies to a person who throws away a good chance.		
ꯂꯩꯅꯥꯡꯅ ꯄꯜ ꯊꯤꯡꯕꯒꯨꯝ	লৈনাঙনা পল থিঙবগুম	Leinangna pal thingbagum	You try to build a wall with soft mud.	It applies to any useless undertaking.		
ꯀꯛꯆꯦꯡ ꯃꯍꯨꯝ ꯊꯨꯒꯥꯏꯕꯒꯨꯝ	ককচেং মহুম থুগাইবগুম	Kakcheng mahum thugaibagum	You are like the man who breaks into an ant-hole.	It applies to anyone who acts incautiously.		
ꯈꯣꯏ ꯃꯍꯨꯝꯗ ꯆꯩꯅ ꯊꯤꯟꯕꯒꯨꯝ	খোই মহুমদা চৈনা থিনবগুম	Khoi mahumda cheina thinbagum	You are like a man who attacks a bee-hive.	It applies to any one who acts incautiously.		
ꯃꯃꯤꯠꯇ ꯄꯛꯄ ꯃꯤꯠꯁꯥꯡꯗꯤ ꯎꯗꯔꯗꯨꯅ ꯃꯤꯒꯤ ꯃꯃꯤꯠꯇ ꯄꯛꯄ ꯃꯤꯠꯁꯥꯡ ꯎꯕꯒꯨꯝ	মমিৎতা পকপা মিৎসাঙদী উদরদুনা মিগী মমিৎতা পকপা মিৎসাঙ উবগুম	Mamitta pakpa mitsangdi udaraduna migi mamitta pakpa mitsang ubagum	You see the dirt in another man's eye, but do not see the dirt in your own eye.		Like the Bible parable of the man who sees the mote in his brother's eye, but fails to see the beam in his own eye.	
ꯀꯩꯅ ꯃꯌꯦꯛ ꯃꯥꯡꯕ꯭ꯔꯥ	কৈনা ময়েক মাঙব্রা	Keina mayek mangbra	You cannot deprive a tiger of its spots.		Can a leopard change its spots ?	
ꯍꯧꯗꯣꯡ ꯇꯨꯃꯤꯜꯂꯩꯕꯅ ꯆꯐꯨ ꯉꯝꯕꯒꯨꯝ	হৌদোঙ তুমিল্লৈবনা চফু ঙম্বগুম	Haudong tumilleibana chafu ngambagum	A cat cannot keep quiet while the cooking pot is near.	Never trust a doubtful character.		
ꯁꯅꯥꯕꯨ ꯐꯗꯤꯅ ꯌꯣꯝꯕꯒꯨꯝ	সনাবু ফদীনা য়োম্বগুম	Sanabu phadina yombagum	You cannot hide gold in a rag.	An able man is sure of promotion.		
ꯈꯣꯡꯗꯅ ꯆꯤꯛꯄ ꯍꯨꯏꯒꯨꯝ	খোংদনা চিকপা হুইগুম	Khongdana chikpa huigum	He is like the dog which bites without barking.	It applies to a man who speaks ill of you behind your back.		

== See also ==
- Tha Tha Thabungton
- Meitei language day
- Meitei language festival
- Meitei language movement
- Meitei poetry day
- List of Meitei folktales
- List of Meitei-language films
- List of Meitei-language newspapers
- List of Meitei-language television channels

== Bibliography ==
- "Morphosemantic Attributes of Meetei Proverbs". Advances in Language and Literary Studies. 6 (3). 2015. ISSN 2203-4714.
- Birjita Devi, Loitongbam (2007). Manipuri Paorou Neinaba (in Manipuri). India: Dr. Ningthoujam Bino Singh, Palace Compound, Imphal; Digital Library of India.
- Amuba Singh, Sanoujam (1985). Ahal Lamangee Paorou Praman Panthei Part. 1 (in Manipuri). India: Digital Library of India.
- Amuba Singh, Sanoujam (1986). Ahal Laman Paorou Part. 2 (in Manipuri). India: Binodini Devi; Digital Library of India.
- Singh, Sanoujam Amuba (1987). Ahal Laman Paorou Praman Panthei Ahumsuba Saruk (in Manipuri). India: Binodini Devi; Digital Library of India.
