= Meitei dialect =

Meitei dialect (or Manipuri dialect) may refer to any of the following:

- Imphal dialect, the standard variety of Meitei language, primarily used in Imphal, the capital city of Manipur state
- Amailon, the holy and sacred variety of Meitei language, used for liturgical purpose of Sanamahism
- Any historical variety of Ancient Meitei language
- Andro (Meitei dialect), a regional variety of Meitei language, spoken in the Andro village in Imphal East district
- A regional variety of Meitei language in Assam
- A regional variety of Meitei language in Bangladesh
- Kakching dialect, a regional variety of Meitei language, spoken in Kakching region
- Khuman dialect, a historical variety of Meitei language, used by the people of Khuman kingdom
- Khurkhul (Meitei dialect), a regional variety of Meitei language, spoken in the Khurkhul village in Imphal West district
- Kwatha dialect, a hilly regional variety of Meitei language
- Any historical variety of Medieval Meitei language
- Any variety of Modern Meitei language
- Moirang dialect, a historical variety of Meitei language, used by the people of Moirang kingdom
- A regional variety of Meitei language in Myanmar (Burma)
- Phayeng (Meitei dialect), a regional variety of Meitei language, spoken in the Kangchup foothill village of Phayeng
- Sekmai (Meitei dialect), a regional variety of Meitei language, spoken in the Sekmai village in Imphal West district
- Thougallon, the royal court register of Meitei language, used by the royal and noble elites
- A regional variety of Meitei language in Tripura
