= Khurkhul (Meitei dialect) =

Dialect of the Meitei language

- Khurkhun
- ꯈꯨꯔꯈꯨꯜ
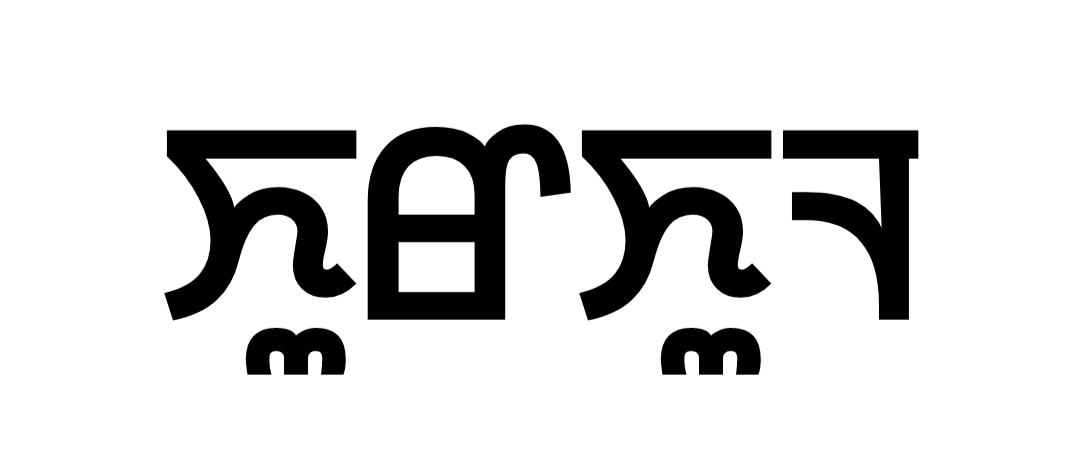
- Meitei Mayek transliteration of "Khurkhul"
- Native to: Manipur
- Region: Khurkhul
- Ethnicity: Meitei ethnicity
- Native speakers: 6,450 (2011)
- Language family: Sino-Tibetan: Tibeto-Burman; Meitei; Khurkhul
- Early form: Ancient Meitei
- Writing system: Meitei script

Language codes
- ISO 639-3: –

In linguistics, Khurkhul dialect (ꯈꯨꯔꯈꯨꯜ) is a variety of Meitei language (Manipuri), spoken by the inhabitants of Khurkhul village, located in Imphal West district of Manipur, India, approximately 15–16 km from the state capital, Imphal. It belongs to the Sino-Tibetan language family. According to the 2011 Census of India, Khurkhul population was 6,450 individuals, with a literacy rate of 78.16%. The native speakers are known as Lois, who traditionally identify themselves as Ariba Meitei (“original Meiteis”).

Khurkhul is considered as critically endangered due to the increasing language shift among younger generations towards major languages. However, it continues to be widely used by the older generation in various domains of community life.

The dialect contains distinctive linguistic features, including specialized vocabulary related to kinship terms and colour terms, expressions of gender, linguistic and non-linguistic forms of politeness, and traditional proverbs and taboos. These features provide insight into the social structure, cultural practices, religious beliefs, and worldview of the Khurkhul-speaking community.

== Etymology ==
Several traditions explain the origin of the name Khurkhul. According to one account, the name is derived from Khoiri Khun (khoiri “umbilical cord” + khun “village”), referring to a place associated with the cutting of an umbilical cord during the reign of King Thangcha Khongchomba and Queen Leinung Yaibilok of Sangaithel. Over time, Khoiri Khun is believed to have evolved into the present name Khurkhul.

Another tradition traces the name to Khoiren Khun (khoi “umbilical” + ren “cut” + khun “village”), referring to the place where an umbilical cord was cut using a blade of grass.

A third tradition derives the name from Khutlukhun (khutlu “knee” + khun “village”). It is associated with a story in which a community representative resisted religious conversion by refusing to comply even while kneeling before the authorities. According to this tradition, the name Khutlukhun later developed into Khurkhul.

== Classification ==
Khurkhul primarily belongs to the Chakpa sub-group of the Loi group of dialects of Meiteilon (Manipuri), eventually belonging to the Tibeto-Burman language family.

== Phonology ==
=== Vowels ===
Khurkhul has 6 vowel phonemes.

Vowels of Khurkhul
	FRONT	CENTRAL	BACK
HIGH	i		u
MID	e	ə	o
LOW		a	

=== Minimal pairs establishing the pure vowels ===
Khurkhul has multiple minimal pairs to make pure vowels.

Minimal pairs establishing the pure vowels of Khurkhul
Minimal pairs	Contexts	Phonemes
[pi] : [pe] 'tear'; 'a kind of umbrella'	[p_]	/i/, /e/
[li] : [la] 'cane'; 'banana leaf'	[l_]	/i/, /a/
[kəmbə] : [kambə] 'cut'; 'greedy'	[k_mbə]	/ə/, /a/
[məroi] : [maroi] 'vegetable'; 'will not rotten'	[m_roi]	/ə/, /a/
[lobə] : [lubə] 'ripe'; 'deep'	[l_bə]	/o/, /u/
[koppə] : [kuppə] 'curve'; 'cover'	[p_bə]	/o/, /u/

=== Positions of pure vowels ===
Positions of the pure vowels
Pure vowels	Initial position	Middle syllable	Final position
i	inuŋ 'inside the house'	cin 'mouth'	Pi 'tear'
e	en 'chicken'	leŋ 'shoulder'	Pe 'a kind of umbrella'
ə	əhan 'day before yesterday'	səŋ 'hut'	sənabə 'to play'
a	aːdə 'there'	labə 'male'	məca 'small'
u	uci 'mouse'	utʰum 'a kind of edible plant'	məpu 'owner'
o	ok 'pork'	lok 'cough'	tʰəro 'lily'

=== Diphthongs ===
Khurkhul has six notable diphthongs.

Diphthongs of Khurkhul
Diphthongs	Initial position	Middle position	Final position
ai		haipʰet 'slightly'	Lai 'God'
əi	əi 'I'	həibə 'to say'	pʰəi 'a seat made out of straw for the rice/curry pot'
oi	Oi 'left'	koibə 'long way'	koi 'not frank'
əw	əwə- əwə 'indicating that the speaker wants to take a break during playing'	pʰəwra 'made of bamboo to dry things like paddy rice, chillies, silk cocoons etc,'	pʰəw 'paddy rice'
ui	Uide 'not dozing'	huibə 'wither'	kʰui 'is narrow'
aw	aw 'a way of saying yes'	nawron 'the gap between two children'	naw 'small'

=== Minimal pairs establishing the diphthongs ===
Minimal pairs establishing the diphthongs of Khurkhul
Minimal pairs	Contexts	Phonemes
[kai] : [kəi] 'made of bamboo to carry a dead body'; 'the place to store firewood'	[k_]	/ai/, /əi/
[lai] : [lei] 'God' 'flower'	[l_]	/ai/, /ei/
[moi] : [məw] 'they' : 'affinal woman'	[m_]	/oi/, /əw/
[loi] : [ləw] 'a group of people' 'paddy field'	[l_]	/oi/, /əw/
[lui] : [law] 'difficult' 'shout (IMP)'	[l_]	/ui/, /aw/
[cui] : [caw] 'stain' 'eat (IMP)'	[c_]	/ui/, /aw/

=== Consonants ===
Consonants of Khurkhul
+ / - Voice	Bilabial		Alveolar		Palatal	Velar		Glottal	
+ / - Voice	-V	+V	-V	+V	-V	-V	+V	-V	+V
Stops: Unaspirate	p	b	t	d	c	k	g		
Stops: Aspirate	pʰ		tʰ			kʰ			
Fricatives					s				H
Nasals	m		n				ŋ		
Lateral		l							
Trills		r							
Semi vowel		w							J

=== Minimal pairs establishing the consonants ===
Minimal pairs establishing the consonants of Khurkhul
Minimal pairs	Contexts	Phonemes
[paː] : [taː] 'eye lash'; 'arrow'	[_aː]	/p/, /t/
[pui] : [tui] 'borrow'; 'fall'	[_ui]	/p/, /t/
[ka] : [kʰa] 'room'; 'south'	[k_]	/k/, /kʰ/
[cəka] : [cəga] 'wheel'; 'place'	[cə_a]	/k/, /g/
[kəw] : [kʰəw] 'ox'; 'throat'	[_əw]	/k/, /kʰ/
[pʰəw] : [tʰəw] 'paddy rice'; 'duty'	[_əw]	/pʰ/, /tʰ/
[pʰan] : [tʰan] 'a kind of stool'; 'bunch of clothes to sell'	[_an]	/pʰ/, /tʰ/
[nəsi] : [məsi] 'today' 'this'	[_əsi]	/m/, /n/
[nai] : [ŋai] 'pun'; 'the kinship relation between the parents of the bride and thegroom'; the social relation between the Khurkhuls and another tribe who exchange necessary support to each other'	[_ai]	/n/, /ŋ/
[ləw] : [rəw] 'paddy field'; 'a kind of fish'	[_əw]	/l/, /r/
[ləsiŋ] : [məsiŋ] 'cotton' 'the fiber in fruits/vegetable'	[_əsiŋ]	/l/, /ŋ/
[wai] : [jai] 'the cover of uncooked rice'; 'a kind of plant used for fishing, i.e. it suffocates the fish for a while'	[_ai]	/w/, /j/
[wabə] : [pabə] 'tire' 'thin'	[_abə]	/w/, /p/
[joŋ] : [loŋ] 'monkey' 'a kind of fishnet used by women'	[_oŋ]	/j/, /l/
[caː] : [saː] 'tea'; 'animal'	[_aː]	/c/, /s/
[cəŋbə] : [səŋbə] 'to enter'; 'free'	[_əŋbə]	/c/, /s/
[həi] : [təi] 'fruit'; 'a kind of frying pan'	[_əi]	/h/, /t/
[hu] : [ju] 'poison'; 'wine'	[_u]	/h/, /j/
[cadə] : [camə] 'out of cent'; 'hundred'	[ca_ə]	/d/, /m/

== Tones ==
Khurkhul has two tones, falling and level. Falling tone is marked by (`) while level tone is unmarked.

Tones of Khurkhul
Level tone	Falling tone
kaŋ (mosquito)	kàŋ (a traditional game)
i (blood)	ì (thatch)
tʰaŋbə (to carry)	tʰàŋbə (pass on )
tʰoŋ (door)	tʰòŋ (bridge)
səmbə (to join)	sə̀mbə (taking short cut)
kʰəŋbə (to get frighten)	kʰə̀ŋbə (to know)
tabə (to fall)	tàbə (to roll)

== Grammar ==
Khurkhul follows Subject Object Verb order.

=== Pronouns ===
Pronouns of Khurkhul
Person	Singular	Dual	Plural
1^{st} Person	əi , ijak, jak	ibani/imani/əik^{h}oni/k^{h}oni ‘we two’	əi k^{h}oi/k^{h}oi/ijak^{h}oi ‘we’
2^{nd} Person	nəŋ ‘you’	nəbani/noini/nəmaini ‘you two’	noi ‘you’ pl.
3^{rd} Person	ma ‘he/she’	moi ni/ məbani ‘they two’	moi ‘they’

=== Adjectives ===
Adjectives in Khurkhul
Quality	Examples
Attribute	p^{h}əcə hui (beautiful dog)
Size	cau hui (big dog)
Colour	mubə hui (black dog)
Gender	hui əmom (female dog)

=== Postpositions ===
Postpositions in Khurkhul
Post-positions	Case
Noun-gi	Genitive case
Noun -də	Dative case
Noun -də	Locative case
Noun -nə	Instrumental
Noun-gə/kə	Associative
Noun-təgi/ dəgi	Ablative
Noun-nə	Nominative

=== Adverbs ===
Adverbs in Khurkhul
Examples	Roots	Adverbial morphemes
ca-nə ca-nə (doing something simultaneously)	ca-	-nə
cao-tək cao-tək (very big)	cao-	-tək
na-ri na-ri (slightly painful)	na	-ri

=== Verb root morphemes ===
Verb root-morphemes
ca-i
eat-non-future
ca-gəni
eat-future
ca-re
eat-perfect
ca-ri
eat-progressive
ca-ro
eat-imperative
ca-nu
eat-prohibitive
ca-de
eat-negation
ca-ge
eat-volition

=== Verbal morphemes ===
Verbal morphemes with Adjectives
Adjectives	Verbal morphemes	Examples
-cao ‘big’	cao-re big-PERF	tombi cao-re tombi-big-PERF ‘Tombi has grown up.’
-waŋ ‘tall’	waŋ-de tall-NEG	tombi waŋ-de tombi-tall-NEG ‘Tombi is not growing.’

=== Wh-words ===
Wh-words	Examples
kəna (who)	tombə-nə kəna paːmi Tomba-NOM Who like ‘Who does Tomba like?’
kəri (what)	nəŋ kəri cai you what eat ‘What do you eat?’
kaidə (where)	tombə kaidə cak cai Tomba where food eat ‘Where does Tomba eat food?’
keigi (why)	nəŋ keigi lairik pai you why book read ‘Why do you read books?’
kəwŋandə (when)	tombə kəwŋan(də) laki Tomba when come ‘When does Tomba come?’
kəjam (how many)	nəŋ pʰiː kəjam sai you clothes how many make ‘How many dresses do you make?’
kəmai(nə) (how)	nəŋ pʰiː kəmai (nə) sai you clothes how make ‘How do you make clothes?’
kəidəwnə (why)	nəŋ pʰiː kəidəwnə sai you clothes why make ‘Why do you make clothes?’
kəramba (which)	nəŋ pʰiː kəramba sai you clothes which make ‘Which clothes do you make?’

== Vocabulary ==
The phatic language in Khurkhul
Khurkhul	Gloss
Chak chariro?	(Are you) eating rice?
Chak thongiro?	(Are you) cooking rice?
Phi suiro?	(Are you) washing clothes?
Tummiro?	(Are you) sleeping?
Phammiro?	(Are you) sitting?
Cha thak (l)iro?	(Are you) drinking tea?
Ensang hek(l)iro?	(Are you) plucking vegetables?

=== Kinship terms ===
Some Kinship address terms
Father’s side	Gloss	Mother’s side	Gloss
pachi	Father	Ima	Mother
ipu	Grandfather	Ipu	Grandfather
ipen	Grandmother	Ipen	Grandmother
ipanthou	Father’s elder brother	imanthou	Mother’s elder sister
imanthou	ipanthou’s wife	Ipanthou	imanthou’s husband
ìton	Father’s younger brother	Inomcha	Mother’s younger sister
inomcha	iton’s wife	Ìton	inomcha’s husband

=== Fillers ===
Khurkhul is notable for using certain kinds of filler words during daily conversation. The percentage of usage of such words vary depending on genders, through a study by Tezpur University.

Use of fillers in Khurkhul by the male and female
Khurkhul fillers	Glosses	Male	Female
Asibai	(it/that/those etc.)	100%	100%
Keino	something	100%	100%
Tune	that's it	100%	100%
Toise	that's what	100%	100%

=== Hedges ===
Khurkhul is found to use hedge words in daily conversation. Women are found to be more frequent in using these words than men, through a study by Tezpur University.

Use of hedges by male and female
Khurkhul Hedges	Gloss	Male	Female
chumdro?	Isn't right?	33%	83%
nattro?	Isn't it?	50%	83%

=== Color terms ===
Colour terms in Khurkhul
Basic colour	Non-basic colour term	The thing	The colour
ANGOUBA (WHITE)	sangkom mapram machu	the upper the layer of boiled milk	slightly reddish white
ANGOUBA (WHITE)	wa pongshang mapram machu	the thin layer inside the bamboo	transparent white
ANGOUBA (WHITE)	chanton machu	sandalwood	very white
ANGOUBA (WHITE)	laphuleiyon machu	the tenderes banana leaf	slightly greenish white
AMUBA (BLACK)	lakang machu	dirt gathered near the cooking hearth	slightly reddish black
AMUBA (BLACK)	kangchet machu	European rhinoceros beetle	slightly more reddish than lakang machu
AMUBA (BLACK)	heikha appatpa machu	rotten plum	light blue
AMUBA (BLACK)	ut machu	ash	Grey
AMUBA (BLACK)	timunapun machu	blind snake	slightly reddish blackish
ANGANGBA (RED)	kurao mapan machu	red coral flower	deep red
ANGANGBA (RED)	salu angangba machu	salu	blackish deep red
ANGANGBA (RED)	soukri mapan machu	roselle flower	close to blackish deep red
ANGANGBA (RED)	kabirei machu	oleander flower	near pink
ANGANGBA (RED)	kaphoi mapan machu	pomegranate flower	close to near pink
ANGANGBA (RED)	kodang machu	the liquid from chewing betel leaf with areca nut	reddish pink
ANGANGBA (RED)	mithai machu	a particular kind of popular sweet	close to above
ANGANGBA (RED)	ureirom machu	bixa orellana	close to above
ANGANGBA (RED)	thangching mapan machu	euryle ferox flower	blackish pink
ASANGBA (GREEN)	khongtrummaku machu	bottle gourd skin	light green
ASANGBA (GREEN)	pangkhokla machu	taro leaf	blackish green
ASANGBA (GREEN)	wana machu	bamboo leaf	more blackish green
ASANGBA (GREEN)	tingkhak mathibong machu	caterpillar intestine	very dark green
ASANGBA (GREEN)	hichang machu	moss	dark green
ASANGBA (GREEN)	Ureng	baby leaf	green
ASANGBA (GREEN)	naspati machu	pears	faded green
ASANGBA (GREEN)	chorphon machu	olive fruit	dull faded green
ASANGBA (GREEN)	santhi machu	cow dung	close to above
HANGKAMPAN (YELLOW)	hangkam maru machu	mustard flower before it blooms	light yellow
HANGKAMPAN (YELLOW)	komlarong machu	orange	reddish yellow
HANGKAMPAN (YELLOW)	sana machu	gold	gold colour
HANGKAMPAN (YELLOW)	mei machu	fire	blackish yellow
HANGKAMPAN (YELLOW)	meiri machu	flame	reddish blackish yellow
HANGKAMPAN (YELLOW)	yaingang machu	Turmeric	deep reddish yellow
HIKOK (BLUE)	khoimu machu	Bee	blackish blue
HIKOK (BLUE)	ising machu	water	light blue
HIKOK (BLUE)	sorraren machu	the sky	close to above
HIKOK (BLUE)	atiya machu	the sky	close to above
HIKOK (BLUE)	meikhet machu	match stick	reddish blue
HIKOK (BLUE)	pitruklei machu	globe amaranth (a kind of flower)	pinkish blue
HIKOK (BLUE)	centre phres machu	wrapper of 'centre fresh'(a popular sweing gum)	deep blue
HIKOK (BLUE)	pangg/kan khamen machu	egg plant	very dark blue
HIKOK (BLUE)	kabokang mapan machu	water hyacinth flower	close to above
HIKOK (BLUE)	samballei machu	duranta (golden dewdrop flower)	close to above
HIKOK (BLUE)	leitan machu	a type soil used for plastering wall	close to above

== Comparison with Standard Meitei ==
Khurkhul dialect			Imphal dialect (Standard dialect)			English translation/equivalent(s)
Meitei Mayek transliteration	Eastern Nagari transliteration	Latinization/Romanization	Meitei Mayek transliteration	Eastern Nagari transliteration	Latinization/Romanization	English translation/equivalent(s)
ꯀꯣꯛ ꯆꯣꯠꯊꯣꯛꯄ	কোক চোৎথোকপা	Kok Chotthokpa	ꯀꯣꯛ ꯇꯨꯝꯕ	কোক তুম্বা	Kok Tumba	Washing head/scalp hair
ꯉꯥꯖꯤꯡ	ঙাজিং	Ngaajing	ꯈꯖꯤꯡ	খজিং	Khajing	Prawn
ꯇꯦꯡꯅꯧ	তেংনৌ	Tengnou	ꯇꯦꯡꯅꯧꯃꯥꯟꯕꯤ	তেংনৌমানবী	Tengnoumanbi	Winged bean (Psophocarpus tetragonolobus)
ꯇꯦꯛꯄꯤ	তেকপী	Tekpi	ꯄꯣꯒꯦ	পোগে	Poge	
ꯆꯨꯃꯥꯏꯆꯨꯝꯕꯤ	চুমাইচুম্বী	Chumaichumbi	ꯃꯥꯏꯈꯨꯝꯕꯤ	মাইখুম্বী	Maikhumbi	Wandering Glider (Pantala flavescens)/Odonata anisoptera (dragonfly larvae)/Baetidae
ꯃꯌꯥꯡꯕꯤ	ময়াংবী	Mayangbi	ꯃꯌꯥꯡꯇꯣꯟ	ময়াংতোন	Mayangton	Hoary Basil, Wild basil, Lemon basil (Ocimum americanum)
ꯋꯥꯍꯤ	ৱাহি	Waahi/Wahi	ꯋꯥꯍꯤꯛ	ৱাহিক	Waahik/Wahik	Plant hopper/Aphid
ꯍꯩꯁꯥꯡ	হৈশাঙ	Heisaang/Heishaang	ꯍꯩꯖꯥꯡ	হৈজাঙ	Heijaang/Heijang	Citron

== Research ==
Louriyam Bebica’s research titled “A Sociolinguistic Study of Khurkhul,” guided by Gautam K. Borah in the Department of English & Foreign Languages at Tezpur University, examines the sociolinguistic aspects of the Khurkhul speech form in Manipur and was published as Series/Report No. T569 on 22 January 2019.

== See also ==
- Andro (Meitei dialect)
- Phayeng (Meitei dialect)
- Sekmai (Meitei dialect)
- Amailon
- Thougallon
- Khuman language
- Moirang language
- Medieval Meitei language
- Modern Meitei language
- Kakching dialect
- Kwatha dialect

== Bibliography ==
- Chandrakala, Ch. 1993. A Comparative Study of Imphal, Sekmai and Khurkhul Dialects of Meiteiron. PhD diss., Manipur University.
- Devi, Lairenlakpam Bino. The Lois of Manipur: Andro, Khurkhul, Phayeng and Sekmai. India: Mittal Publications, 2002.
- Louriyam, Bebica Devi (2017). A sociolinguistic study of Khurkhul (Thesis). hdl:10603/201842.
- Linguistic Heritage of India and Asia. India: Central Institute of Indian Languages, 2000.
- Indian Linguistics. India: Linguistic Society of India., 2006.
- Manipur. India: Anthropological Survey of India, 1998. p. 110–118.
