= Sekmai (Meitei dialect) =

Dialect of the Meitei language

- Sengmai, Awang Sekmai
- ꯁꯦꯛꯃꯥꯏ
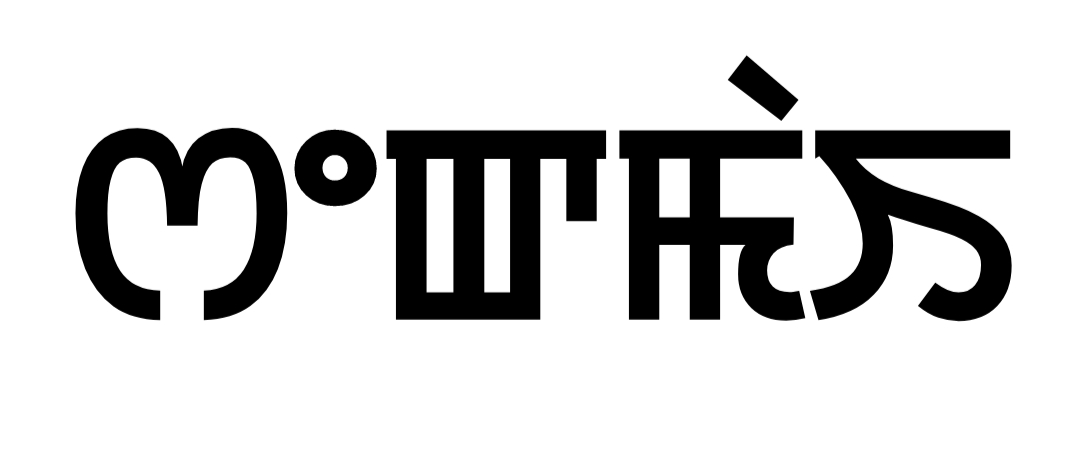
- Meitei Mayek transliteration of "Sekmai"
- Native to: Manipur
- Region: Sekmai
- Ethnicity: Meitei ethnicity
- Language family: Sino-Tibetan
- Early form: Ancient Meitei
- Writing system: Meitei script

Language codes
- ISO 639-3: –

Sekmai dialect (also spelled Sengmai or referred to as Awang Sekmai) is a geographical and social dialect of the Meitei (Manipuri), a Sino-Tibetan language spoken in Northeast India. It is classified alongside the Phayeng and Andro speech forms under the Chakpa (or Loi) group of dialects, (Note: The group of people called Chakpa (or Loi), who live in the places called Sekmai, Andro, Phayeng, used to speak certain dialects (now extinct), which belong to a separate branch of Tibeto-Burman linguistic family, notably distinct from Meitei linguistic group. But all those dialects got extinct with the replacement of their speech forms by the dominant Meitei language in historical times, and the current so called eponymous dialects of Sekmai, Phayeng and Andro are the living linguistic varieties/dialects of their present-day native language, Meitei.) which are distinct from Standard Meitei (the Imphal dialect). The dialect is primarily spoken by the Chakpa community residing in the Sekmai region of the Imphal West district in Manipur. Because it developed outside the primary socio-political center of the Imphal capital region, it preserves Ancient Meitei phonological structures and vocabulary, that have been altered or lost in the standard language.

Sekmai as a regional dialect of Meitei language is mentioned in the academic writings of Linguistic Society of India (2006), H. Sarojkumar Singh (1988), Shobhana Lakshmi Chelliah (1997), Chungkham Yashwanta Singh (2008), and H.W. Wilson (2001).

== Classification and context ==
Within the dialectal landscape of the Meitei language, Sekmai is categorized as a peripheral dialect. Despite structural and phonetic deviations, Sekmai and Standard Meitei retain high mutual intelligibility. Historically, the speakers belong to the Chakpa settlements. Due to their ancestral geographical isolation from the cultural shifts that affected the Imphal capital region, the speech form avoided substantial lexical assimilation from Indo-Aryan languages like Sanskrit and Bengali.

== Comparison with standard dialect ==
Sekmai dialect			Imphal dialect (Standard dialect)			English translation/equivalent(s)
Meitei Mayek transliteration	Eastern Nagari transliteration	Latinization/Romanization	Meitei Mayek transliteration	Eastern Nagari transliteration	Latinization/Romanization	English translation/equivalent(s)
ꯃꯔꯣꯌꯕꯥꯛ ꯐꯗꯤꯒꯣꯝ	মরোয়বাক ফদিগোম	Maroybak Phadigom	ꯑꯋꯥ ꯐꯗꯤꯒꯣꯝ	অৱা ফদিগোম	Awa Phadigom	Eryngium foetidum/Eryngo/False coriander
ꯃꯗꯥꯑꯣ	মদাও	Madao	ꯏꯇꯥꯑꯣ	ইতাও	Itao	Male friend
ꯌꯥꯝꯕ(ꯁꯤꯡ)	য়াম্ব(শিং)	Yaamba(shing)/Yamba(sing)	ꯏꯌꯥꯝꯕ(ꯁꯤꯡ)	ইয়াম্ব(শিং)	Iyaamba(shing)/Iyamba(sing)	Elder/Older/Senior brother(s)
ꯌꯥꯋꯥꯟ	য়াৱান	Yaawaan/Yawan	ꯎꯌꯥꯟ	উয়ান	Uyaan/Uyan	Cooking pot
ꯀꯣꯔꯤꯡꯀꯣꯠ	কোরিংকোৎ	Koringkot	ꯈꯣꯌꯅꯤꯡ	খোয়নিং	Khoyning/Khoining	Bulbul
ꯂꯥꯡꯈꯣꯡ	লাংখোং	Laangkhong	ꯈꯣꯡꯕꯥꯟ	খোঙবান	Khongban	Ditch; Drainage
ꯁꯪꯕꯥꯏ/ꯁꯡꯕꯥꯏ	শংবাই	Shangbai/Sangbai	ꯊꯨꯃꯣꯛ	থুমোক	Thumok/Thummok	Basket
ꯄꯨꯡꯈꯣꯟ ꯃꯦꯡꯑꯦ	পুংখোন মেংএ	Pungkhon Meng-e	ꯄꯨꯡꯈꯣꯟ ꯊꯣꯠꯂꯦ	পুংখোন থোৎলে	Pungkhon Thotle	The sound of drum is soft.
ꯆꯥꯔꯄꯣꯠꯂꯥ / ꯆꯥꯗ꯭ꯔꯤꯕꯣꯠꯂꯥ	চারপোৎলা / চাদ্রিবোৎলা	Chaarapotla / Chaadribotla	ꯆꯥꯛ ꯆꯥꯔꯕꯔꯥ	চাক চারবরা	Chaak Chaarabara	Have you had your meal?
ꯅꯥꯔꯦ	নারে	Naare	ꯅꯥꯕ	নাবা	Naaba	Ill/Unwell

== Archaic vocabulary retention ==
Unlike the standard dialect, which integrated extensive Indo-Aryan loanwords following the historical adoption of Hinduism in the Imphal region, Sekmai has retained a larger proportion of its indigenous Tibeto-Burman vocabulary. It preserves ancient roots and lexical units that are obsolete or completely absent in modern Standard Meitei.

== Prosody and tone ==
Sekmai operates on a tonal system consistent with the broader Meitei language structure. However, it exhibits localized variations in pitch contours, phonetic duration, and sentence-level intonational patterns that distinguish it audibly from the Imphal standard.

== Research and documentation ==
The Sekmai dialect is utilized in comparative linguistics to study the historical development of the Tibeto-Burman languages in Northeast India. Academic institutions and bodies, including the Central Institute of Indian Languages (CIIL), document the Awang Sekmai speech form to record phonetic variations, in the compilation of the "Manipuri Raw Speech Corpus" (Catalogue Number: 1148), consisting of more than 156 hours of 66,231 audio segments of 620 speakers. These field recordings contribute data toward computational linguistics projects, such as the construction of digital speech corpora for the preservation of minority dialects in the region.

== See also ==
- Amailon
- Thougallon
- Khuman language
- Moirang language
- Medieval Meitei language
- Modern Meitei language
- Kakching dialect
- Kwatha dialect
