= Chakpa dialect =

Chakpa dialect may refer to:

- Extinct dialects of Chakpa language, an extinct member of Jingpho–Luish linguistic branch:
  - Andro (extinct dialect)
  - Khurkhul (extinct dialect)
  - Phayeng (extinct dialect)
  - Sekmai (extinct dialect)
- Living and spoken dialects of Meitei language (also called Manipuri), in the eponymous regions of their native places:
  - Andro (Meitei dialect), spoken in Andro village, Imphal East district of Manipur
  - Khurkhul (Meitei dialect), spoken in Khurkhul village, Imphal West district of Manipur
  - Phayeng (Meitei dialect), spoken in Phayeng village, Imphal West district of Manipur
  - Sekmai (Meitei dialect), spoken in Sekmai village, Imphal West district of Manipur
