= Phayeng (Meitei dialect) =

Dialect of the Meitei language

- Fayeng, Chakpa Phayeng
- ꯐꯌꯦꯡ
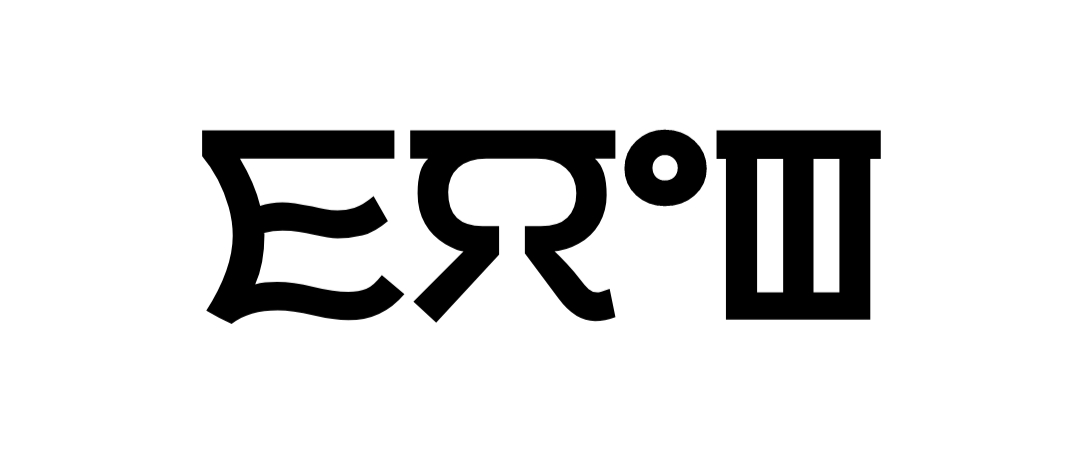
- Meitei Mayek transliteration of "Phayeng"
- Native to: Manipur
- Region: Phayeng
- Ethnicity: Meitei ethnicity
- Native speakers: 2728 (2016 survey)
- Language family: Sino-Tibetan
- Early form: Ancient Meitei
- Writing system: Meitei script

Language codes
- ISO 639-3: –
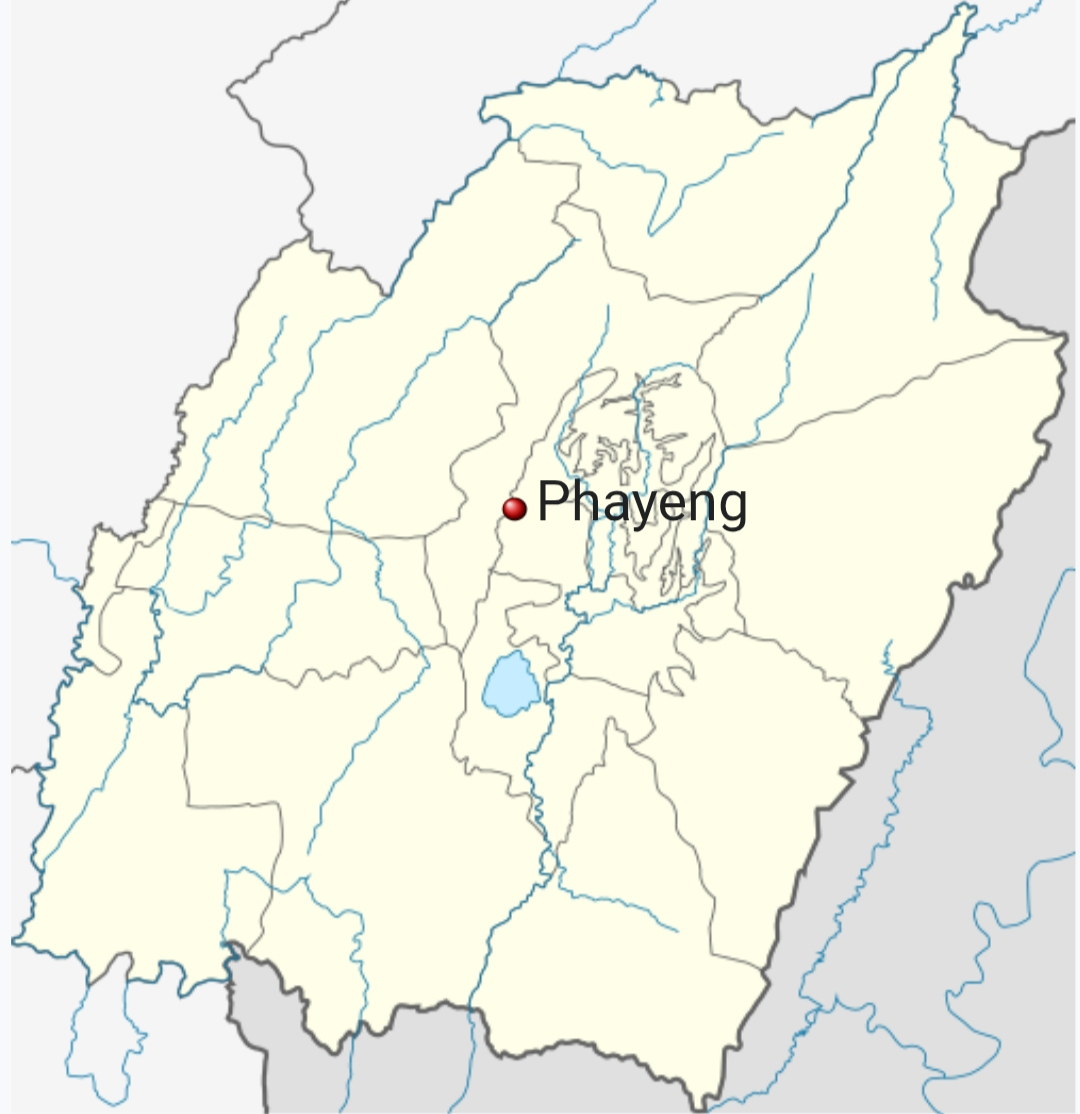
- Place in Manipur, where Phayeng dialect is spoken natively

In linguistics, Phayeng (ꯐꯌꯦꯡ), also known as Chakpa Phayeng (ꯆꯛꯄ ꯐꯌꯦꯡ), is an endangered, geographical and social dialect of the Meitei (Manipuri), a Sino-Tibetan language spoken in Northeast India. It is classified alongside the Andro and Sekmai speech forms under the Chakpa (or Loi) group of dialects, (Note: The group of people called Chakpa (or Loi), who live in the places called Phayeng, Andro, Sekmai, used to speak certain dialects (now extinct), which belong to a separate branch of Tibeto-Burman linguistic family, notably distinct from Meitei linguistic group. But all those dialects got extinct with the replacement of their speech forms by the dominant Meitei language in historical times, and the current so called eponymous dialects of Phayeng, Andro and Sekmai are the living linguistic varieties/dialects of their present-day native language, Meitei.) which are distinct from Standard Meitei (the Imphal dialect). The dialect is primarily spoken by the Chakpa community residing in the Phayeng region of the Imphal West district in Manipur. Because it developed outside the primary socio-political center of the Imphal capital region, it preserves Ancient Meitei phonological structures and vocabulary, that have been altered or lost in the standard language.

Phayeng as a regional dialect of Meitei language is mentioned in the academic publications of Linguistic Society of India (2006), Chungkham Yashwanta Singh (2008), "Center for Endangered Languages" of Tezpur University, and H.W. Wilson (2001). It is considered to be one of the least documented or the least studied dialects of Meitei language.

== Classification and context ==
The area where Chakpa Phayeng is spoken is situated in the foot hills of Kangchup Chingkhong, located in the Imphal Valley (Central Manipur plains), and is 13km away from the district headquarter Lamsang of Imphal West district.

Within the dialectal continuum of the Meitei language, Phayeng is recognized as a peripheral dialect. Although it exhibits certain structural and phonetic differences from Standard Meitei, the two varieties remain largely mutually intelligible. Historically, the speakers of Phayeng are associated with the Chakpa settlements. Owing to the community's relative geographical isolation from the cultural and linguistic developments centered in the Imphal region, the dialect retained many of its earlier lexical features and experienced comparatively limited influence from Indo-Aryan languages such as Sanskrit and Bengali.

According to a 2016 survey of a team of Tezpur University from Assam, the Chakpa Phayeng community had 660 families (houses), having a population of 2728 people.

== Phonology ==
=== Consonant system ===
Table: The Consonant system of Chakpa Phayeng
		Bilabial	Labio- dental	Alveolar	Palato- alveolar	Palatal	Velar	Glottal
Plosive		p		t		c	k	
Plosive	Aspirated	pʰ		tʰ			kʰ	
Nasal		m		n			ŋ	
Fricative				s				h
Trill				r				
Lateral				l				
Approximant		w				j		

=== Vowel system ===
The Vowel system of Chakpa Phayeng
	Front	Central	Back
Close	• i		u •
Close-mid	• e		o •
Open-mid		ə	
Open	• a		

== Comparison with standard dialect ==
Phayeng dialect			Imphal dialect (Standard dialect)			English translation/equivalent(s)
Meitei Mayek transliteration	Eastern Nagari transliteration	Latinization/Romanization	Meitei Mayek transliteration	Eastern Nagari transliteration	Latinization/Romanization	English translation/equivalent(s)
ꯏꯄꯦ	ইপে	Eepe/Ipe	ꯏꯕ	ইবা	Eeba/Iba	writing
ꯈꯆꯤꯛ	খচিক	Khachik	ꯈꯖꯤꯡ	খজিং	Khajing	Prawn
ꯄꯨꯇꯦ	পুতে	Poote/Pute	ꯄꯨꯗꯦ	পুদে	Poode/Pude	
ꯐꯪꯄꯦ	ফংপে	Phangpe	ꯐꯪꯕ	ফংবা	Phangba	to find/to get
ꯃꯩꯔꯥꯟꯄꯤ	মৈরানপি	Meiraanpee/Meiranpi	ꯃꯩꯔꯥꯟꯕꯤ	মৈরানবি	Meiraanbee/Meiranbi	
ꯇꯣꯂꯥꯏ	তোলাই	Tolai	ꯗꯣꯂꯥꯏ	দোলাই	Dolai	Palanquin
ꯂꯨꯍꯣꯡꯄꯦ	লুহোংপে	Luhongpe	ꯂꯨꯍꯣꯡꯕ	লুহোংবা	Luhongba	Wedding
ꯈꯨꯇꯣꯞ	খুতোপ	Khutop	ꯈꯨꯗꯣꯞ	খুদোপ	Khudop	Ring
ꯈꯨꯠꯇꯝ	খুৎতম	Khuttam	ꯈꯨꯗꯝ	খুদম	Khudam	Evidence/Proof/Testimony
ꯌꯦꯡꯄꯦ	য়েংপে	Yengpe	ꯌꯦꯡꯕ	য়েংবা	Yengba	to look/too see
Chakpa dialect			Standard Meitei			English translation/equivalent(s)
Meitei Mayek transliteration	Eastern Nagari transliteration	Latinization/Romanization	Meitei Mayek transliteration	Eastern Nagari transliteration	Latinization/Romanization	English translation/equivalent(s)
ꯅꯥꯁꯦ/ꯅꯥꯁꯤ	নাসে/নাসী	Naase/Naasi	ꯏꯅꯥꯎ/ꯏꯅꯥꯑꯣ	ইনাও	Inao/Eenao	Younger brother
ꯄꯁꯨ/ꯑꯄꯤ	পসু/অপী	Pasu/Api	ꯏꯌꯥꯝꯕ	ইয়াম্বা	Iyamba/Eeyaamba	Elder brother
ꯍꯨꯜꯖꯦꯡꯁꯦ	হুলজেংসে	Huljengse	ꯀꯩꯖꯦꯡꯂꯥꯡ	কৈজেংলাং	Keijenglang	A type of wild cat
ꯐꯌꯥ/ꯐꯩꯌꯥ	ফয়া/ফৈয়া	Phaya/Pheiya	ꯐꯨꯔꯥ	ফুরা	Phura	Memorial monument
ꯋꯥꯜꯍꯨ/ꯋꯥꯜꯈꯨ	ৱালহু/ৱালখু	Walhu/Walkhu	ꯃꯩꯈꯨ	মৈখু	Meikhu	Smoke
ꯐꯣꯟ/ꯐꯨ	ফোন/ফু	Phon/Phu	ꯁꯤꯡ	শীঙ	Sing/Shing	Woods/Timber
ꯍꯪꯒꯣꯜ/ꯍꯪꯖꯤꯜ	হঙগোল/হঙজীল	Hanggol/Hangjil	ꯍꯧꯗꯣꯡ	হৌদোং	Houdong	Cat

== Vocabularies ==
=== Pronominals ===
Pronominals of Chakpa Phayeng
Gloss		Chakpa Phayeng	Meitei Mayek transliteration
1	SG	əi	ꯑꯩ
1	DL	əikhoi	ꯑꯩꯈꯣꯏ
1	PL	əikhoi	ꯑꯩꯈꯣꯏ
2	SG	nəŋ	ꯅꯪ
2	DL	nəkhoi	ꯅꯈꯣꯏ
2	PL	nəkhoi	ꯅꯈꯣꯏ
3	SG	məhak	ꯃꯍꯥꯛ
3	DL	məkhoi	ꯃꯈꯣꯏ
3	PL	məkhoi	ꯃꯈꯣꯏ

=== Cardinals ===
Cardinal Numerals of Chakpa Phayeng
Cardinal Numeral	Chakpa phayeng	Meitei Mayek transliteration
1	əma	ꯑꯃ
2	əni	ꯑꯅꯤ
3	əhum	ꯑꯍꯨꯝ
4	mali	ꯃꯂꯤ
5	maŋa	ꯃꯉꯥ
6	taruk	ꯇꯔꯨꯛ
7	taret	ꯇꯔꯦꯠ
8	nipal	ꯅꯤꯄꯥꯜ
9	mapal	ꯃꯥꯄꯜ
10	tara	ꯇꯔꯥ
100	cama	ꯆꯥꯃ
1000	lisiŋ	ꯂꯤꯁꯤꯡ

=== Ordinals ===
Ordinal Numerals of Chakpa Phayeng
Ordinal Numeral	Chakpa phayeng	Meitei Mayek transliteration
1^{st}	əhanpa	ꯑꯍꯥꯟꯄ
2^{nd}	ənisupa	ꯑꯅꯤꯁꯨꯄ
3^{rd}	əhumsupa	ꯑꯍꯨꯝꯁꯨꯄ
4^{th}	malisupa	ꯃꯂꯤꯁꯨꯄ
5^{th}	maŋasupa	ꯃꯉꯥꯁꯨꯄ
6^{th}	taruksupa	ꯇꯔꯨꯛꯁꯨꯄ
7^{th}	taretsupa	ꯇꯔꯦꯠꯁꯨꯄ
8^{th}	nipalsupa	ꯅꯤꯄꯥꯜꯁꯨꯄ
9^{th}	mapalsupa	ꯃꯥꯄꯜꯁꯨꯄ
10^{th}	tarasupa	ꯇꯔꯥꯁꯨꯄ
100^{th}	camasupa	ꯆꯥꯃꯁꯨꯄ

=== Human body terms ===
Human Body Terms in Chakpa Phayeng
Gloss	Chakpa Phayeng	Meitei Mayek transliteration
Eye	mit	ꯃꯤꯠ
Ear	nakoŋ	ꯅꯥꯀꯣꯡ
Head	kok	ꯀꯣꯛ
Hair	səm	ꯁꯝ
Tongue	ləi	ꯂꯩ
Tooth	ja	ꯌꯥ
Nose	naton	ꯅꯥꯇꯣꯟ
Hand	khut	ꯈꯨꯠ
Leg	khoŋ	ꯈꯣꯡ

=== Kinship terms ===
Kinship Terms in Chakpa Phayeng
Gloss	Chakpa phayeng	Meitei Mayek transliteration
Parents	ipaima	ꯏꯄꯥꯏꯃꯥ
Father	ipa	ꯏꯄꯥ
Mother	ima	ꯏꯃꯥ
Daughter	icanupi	ꯏꯆꯥꯅꯨꯄꯤ
Son	icanupa	ꯏꯆꯥꯅꯨꯄꯥ
Grandfather	ipupok	ꯏꯄꯨꯄꯣꯛ
Grandmother	ipenpok	ꯏꯄꯦꯟꯄꯣꯛ
Brother	inao	ꯏꯅꯥꯎ
Sister	ice	ꯏꯆꯦ
Husband	ipuroipa	ꯏꯄꯨꯔꯣꯏꯄ
Wife	itu	ꯏꯇꯨ

=== Nature terms ===
Nature Terms in Chakpa Phayeng
Gloss	Chakpa phayeng	Meitei Mayek transliteration
Stone	nuŋ	ꯅꯨꯡ
Water	isiŋ	ꯏꯁꯤꯡ
Fire	məi	ꯃꯩ
Wind	nuŋsit	ꯅꯨꯡꯁꯤꯠ
Cloud	məŋlipa noŋ	ꯃꯪꯂꯤꯄ ꯅꯣꯡ
Rain	noŋ	ꯅꯣꯡ
Sun	numit	ꯅꯨꯃꯤꯠ
Moon	tha	ꯊꯥ
River	turen	ꯇꯨꯔꯦꯟ
Mountain	əwaŋpaciŋ	ꯑꯋꯥꯡꯄꯆꯤꯡ

=== Flora and fauna terms ===
Flora and Fauna Terms in Chakpa Phayeng
Gloss	Chakpa phayeng	Meitei Mayek transliteration
Tree	upampi	ꯎꯄꯥꯝꯄꯤ
Root	məra	ꯃꯔꯥ
Leaf	una	ꯎꯅꯥ
Flower	ləi	ꯂꯩ
Fruit	uhəi	ꯎꯍꯩ
Seed	məru	ꯃꯔꯨ
Animal	sa	ꯁꯥ
Bird	ucek	ꯎꯆꯦꯛ
Fish	ŋa	ꯉꯥ
Nest	ucekməhum	ꯎꯆꯦꯛꯃꯍꯨꯝ
Wing	məsa	ꯃꯁꯥ
Tail	məməi	ꯃꯃꯩ
Horn	məci	ꯃꯆꯤ

=== Housing and items ===
Housing and Items in Chakpa Phayeng
Gloss	Chakpa phayeng	Meitei Mayek transliteration
Door	thoŋ	ꯊꯥꯡ
Window	thoŋnao	ꯊꯣꯡꯅꯥꯎ
Kitchen	caksəŋ	ꯆꯥꯛꯁꯪ
Bed	phəmuŋ	ꯐꯃꯨꯡ
Bench	phansaŋ	ꯐꯥꯟꯁꯥꯡ
Knife	thaŋ	ꯊꯥꯡ
Basket	polaŋ	ꯄꯣꯂꯥꯡ

=== Color terms ===
Color Terms in Chakpa Phayeng
Gloss	Chakpa phayeng	Meitei Mayek transliteration
Black	amubə	ꯑꯃꯨꯕ
White	aŋəupə	ꯑꯉꯧꯄ
Green	asəŋpə	ꯑꯁꯪꯄ
Blue	hikok	ꯍꯤꯀꯣꯛ
Yellow	sənamacu	ꯁꯅꯥꯃꯆꯨ
Red	aŋaŋpə	ꯑꯉꯥꯡꯄ

== Archaic vocabulary retention ==
In marked contrast to the standardized variety of Meitei, whose lexical inventory underwent profound and sustained Indo-Aryanization as a consequence of the historical institutionalization of Hinduism within the political and cultural nucleus of the Imphal capital region, the Phayeng dialect has demonstrably retained a substantially greater proportion of its inherited indigenous Tibeto-Burman lexicon, thereby preserving an extensive corpus of archaic lexical roots, etymologically conservative morphemes, and historically continuous lexical units that have either undergone complete obsolescence, experienced semantic replacement, or disappeared altogether from the vocabulary of contemporary Standard Meitei, consequently rendering the dialect an exceptionally valuable repository of pre-Hinduization linguistic strata and a critical source for the diachronic reconstruction of earlier phases in the historical evolution of the Meitei language.

== Religious significance ==
The dialect continues to occupy a significant functional and symbolic position within the sociocultural and ethnolinguistic repertoire of the community, where its use is preserved and reproduced across a range of culturally salient and ritually institutionalized domains. Its vitality is particularly evident in contexts characterized by high ceremonial and religious value, including the community's annual ritual cycles, commemorative and mortuary observances, and the performance of traditional ceremonial practices such as Lai Haraoba. Within these settings, the dialect functions not merely as a medium of verbal communication but as an index of collective identity, ancestral continuity, and ritual authenticity, mediating interactions between human participants, ancestral spirits, and traditional deities, such as Sanamahi, Leimarel, Pakhangba, Soraren, and Koubru. Furthermore, the dialect remains integral to quotidian religious practices, including the recitation of prayers, invocations, ritual formulae, and other forms of liturgical discourse directed toward indigenous deities. The sustained use of the dialect within these restricted yet culturally significant domains reflects a pattern of functional specialization commonly associated with language maintenance under conditions of sociolinguistic shift, whereby linguistic forms are retained as repositories of historical memory, cosmological knowledge, and ethnocultural identity.

== Study ==
A field study on the Chakpa Phayeng dialect was conducted by Center for Endangered Languages of Tezpur University, Assam, in Chakpa Phayeng village, Manipur, from 16 to 30 June 2016, contributing to the documentation and study of this endangered linguistic variety. They had 3 field trips, collecting 1050 lexical items, 150 sentences, 2 folk songs, and 2 narratives. The literacy rate of the Chakpa Phayeng community was found to be 75.17%. The male literacy rate stood at 83.88% while the female literacy rate was 67.13%.

== See also ==
- Amailon
- Thougallon
- Khuman language
- Moirang language
- Medieval Meitei language
- Modern Meitei language
- Kakching dialect
- Kwatha dialect
