= Andro (Meitei dialect) =

Dialect of the Meitei language

- ꯑꯟꯗ꯭ꯔꯣ
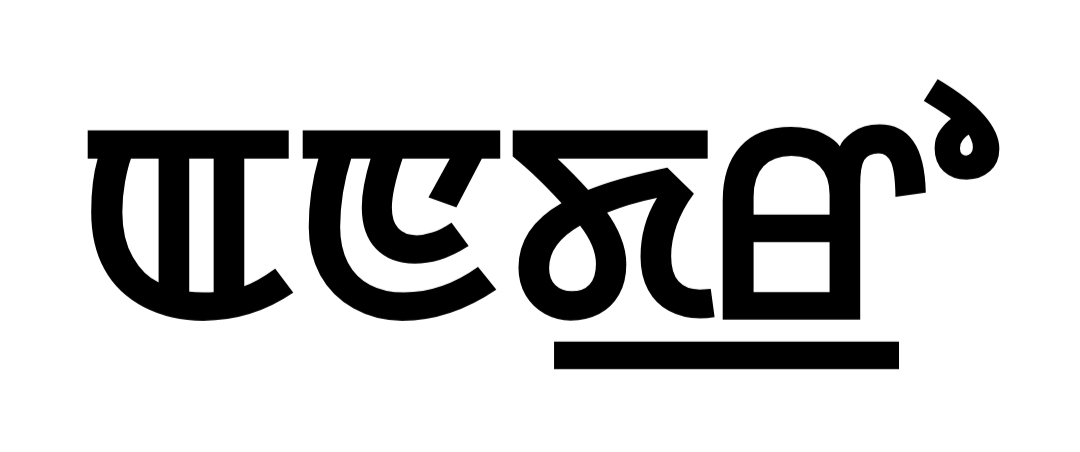
- Meitei Mayek transliteration of "Andro"
- Native to: Manipur
- Region: Andro, Imphal East
- Ethnicity: Meitei ethnicity
- Language family: Sino-Tibetan
- Early form: Ancient Meitei
- Writing system: Meitei script

Language codes
- ISO 639-3: –
- Location within Manipur Location within India
- Coordinates: 24.777273°N 94.06322°E

Andro dialect (ꯑꯟꯗ꯭ꯔꯣ) is a geographical and social dialect of the Meitei language, a Sino-Tibetan language spoken in Northeast India, primarily spoken by the Chakpa community of Andro, Imphal East, Manipur. Because it developed outside the primary socio-political center of the Imphal capital region, it preserves Ancient Meitei phonological structures and vocabulary, that have been altered or lost in the standard language. It is one of several Chakpa or Loi dialects, along with Phayeng and Sekmai which are distinct from Standard Meitei (the Imphal dialect).

== Classification and context ==
Within the dialectological classification of Meitei (Manipuri), Phayeng is identified as a peripheral dialect. Despite exhibiting systematic phonological, lexical, and morphosyntactic divergences from Standard Meitei, it maintains a high degree of mutual intelligibility, indicating sustained structural convergence within the Meitei dialect continuum. Historically, the speech community is affiliated with the Chakpa settlements, representing one of the older ethnolinguistic strata of the Meitei population. The community's prolonged geographical separation from the sociocultural and linguistic innovations centered in the Imphal region appears to have constrained the diffusion of lexical borrowings associated with Indo-Aryan contact. Consequently, the Phayeng dialect preserves a comparatively conservative lexicon, exhibiting a lower incidence of Sanskrit- and Bengali-derived loanwords than Standard Meitei.

== Comparison with standard dialect ==
| Andro dialect | Imphal dialect (Standard Meitei) | English |
|---|---|---|
| ꯄꯣꯗꯣꯟ, podon | ꯊꯥꯡꯃꯩ, thangmei | lamp |
| ꯀꯨꯗꯨꯛ ꯀꯨꯗꯥꯛ, kuduk kudak | ꯑꯀꯨꯠ ꯑꯇꯣꯡ, akut atong | depth, height |
| ꯄ꯭ꯔꯦꯡꯈꯨꯠ, prengkhut | ꯈꯣꯏꯅꯤꯡ, khoining | bulbul |
| ꯆꯨꯝ, chum | ꯅꯨꯃꯤꯠ ꯌꯨꯡꯕꯤ, numit yungbi | chameleon |
| ꯐꯛꯂꯥꯡ ꯆꯨꯝ, phaklang chum | ꯆꯨꯝ, chum | house lizard |
| ꯉꯥꯈꯥ, ngakha | ꯉꯁꯥꯡ, ngashang | giant danio |
| ꯊꯥꯡꯖꯧ, thangjou | ꯂꯧꯔꯤꯊꯥꯡ, lourithang | a type of sword |
| ꯎꯊꯔꯣꯏ, utharoi | ꯂꯩꯀꯪ ꯊꯔꯣꯏ, leikang tharoi | a type of snail |
| ꯂꯥꯡꯈꯣꯡ, langkhong | ꯈꯣꯡꯕꯥꯟ, khongban | ditch |
| ꯍꯨꯝꯐꯨ, humfu | ꯍꯨꯝꯕꯨ, humbu | sixty |
| ꯈꯔꯪ, kharang | ꯎꯃꯥꯏꯕꯤ, umaibi | eagle |
| ꯍꯩꯃꯔꯥꯡ, heimarang | ꯍꯩꯃꯥꯡ, heimang | a type of fruit |

== Archaic vocabulary retention ==
In contrast to Standard Meitei, whose lexicon underwent extensive Indo-Aryanization following the institutionalization of Hinduism within the Imphal politico-cultural nucleus, the Andro lect exhibits a markedly higher degree of lexical conservatism, retaining a substantially greater proportion of inherited Tibeto-Burman etyma. Its lexicon preserves numerous archaic lexical roots and morpholexical units that have undergone obsolescence, lexical replacement, or complete attrition in contemporary Standard Meitei, thereby constituting a significant repository of pre-Indo-Aryan linguistic strata.

== See also ==
- Amailon
- Thougallon
- Khuman language
- Moirang language
- Medieval Meitei language
- Modern Meitei language
- Kakching dialect
- Kwatha dialect

== Bibliography ==
- Dina, Ch (2018-02-22). Finding the Roots Andro and Sengmai Communities: History Along Mekong River. ISBN 978-1-64153-094-1.
