= Classical Meitei (disambiguation) =

Classical Meitei may also refer to:

- Classical or literary variant of Meitei language (also known as Manipuri)
  - Thougallon, the imperial court registered variant of Meitei language
  - Amailon, the liturgical ritualistic variant of Meitei language, used for Sanamahi religion
- Ancient Meitei language (also called Old Manipuri), an early form of Meitei language
- Classical canon of literary works from Ancient Meitei literature
- Meitei classical language movement, a linguistic social movement demanding official recognition of Meitei as an official classical language of India
- Manipuri classical dance, one of the major classical dance forms of India
