= Classical Manipuri =

Classical Manipuri may refer to:

- Classical or literary variant of Meitei language (also known as Manipuri language)
  - Thougallon, the imperial court registered variant of Meitei language
  - Amailon, the liturgical ritualistic variant of Meitei language, used for Sanamahi religion
  - Ancient Meitei language (also called Old Manipuri), an early form of Meitei language
- Classical canon of literary works from Ancient Meitei literature (Old Manipuri literature)

== See also ==
- Meitei classical dance
