= Phayeng dialect =

Phayeng dialect (or, Chakpa Phayeng dialect or Fayeng dialect) may refer to:

- Phayeng (Meitei dialect), a living dialect of Meitei language
- Phayeng (extinct dialect), a dialect once spoken in Phayeng region, which was replaced by Meitei language
