= Greater Imphal =

Place in Manipur

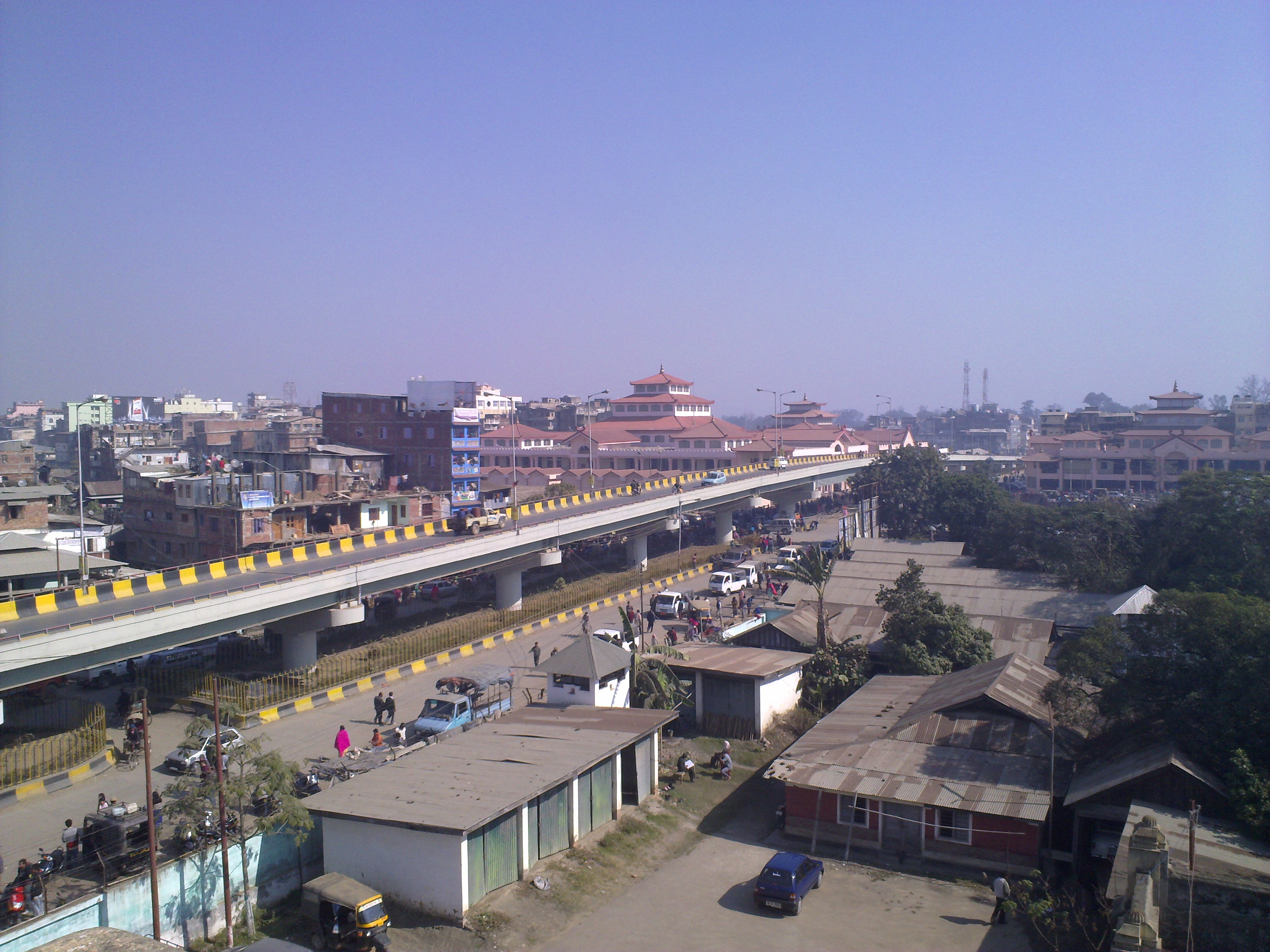
Imphal city is a part of the Greater Imphal.

Greater Imphal (Meitei: ꯒ꯭ꯔꯦꯇꯔ ꯏꯝꯐꯥꯜ) is an area that covers parts of both Imphal East district and Imphal West district. It covers Imphal Municipal Corporation, 16 Census Towns, 5 Out-Growths, 56 villages, Langol Hill Reserve Forest. It covers an area of 151.38 km^{2}.

Greater Imphal and its nearby areas are the primary linguistic zones of the Imphal dialect, which is the standard dialect of Meitei language, officially known as Manipuri language, and is natively used in the region.

== Areas covered ==
In 1994, the area set for Greater Imphal's development was 82.89 km^{2}, while the total area in the Master Plan is 135.29 km^{2}, including parts of Imphal East and West districts. The Greater Imphal Master Plan for 2043 covers about 151 km^{2}, updated in 2020. The area is surrounded by rivers, drains, and hills. To the north, it borders the Imphal River and parts of Konsam Leikai and Laishram Leikai villages. To the east, it borders villages beyond Iril River. To the south, it includes parts of Machahal, Takhok Awang, Loumanbi, Bashikhong, Kiyamgei, Langthabal Kunja, Langthabal Lap, Ningombam, and Meitram villages. To the west, it borders parts of Meitram, Malom Tuliahal, Malom Tuliyaima, Mongsangei, Ghari, Langjing, and Langol Hills, ending at the Imphal River near Khonghampat.

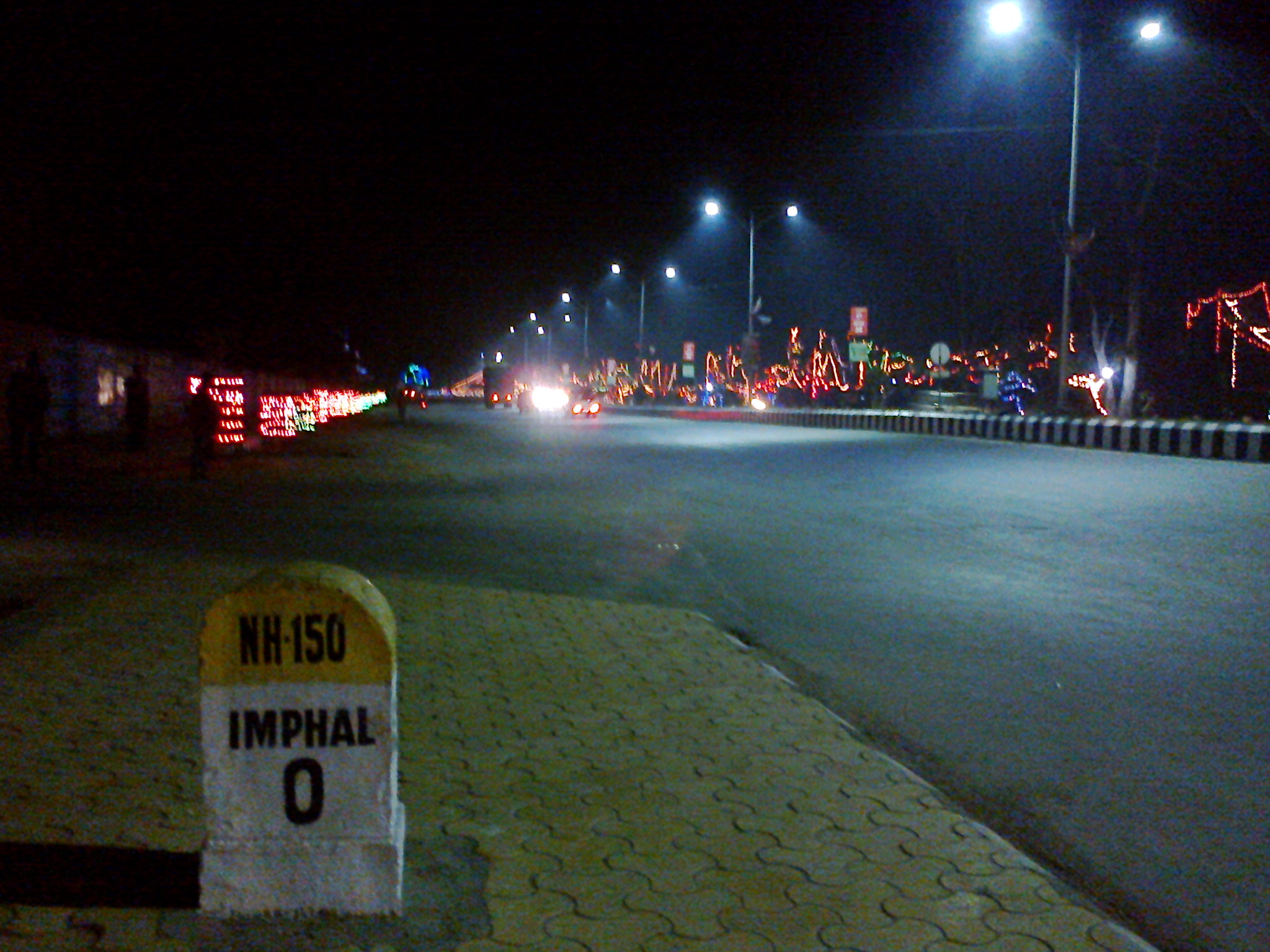
Imphal city is a part of the Greater Imphal.

== Proposed boundaries ==
The proposed boundary for Greater Imphal Master Plan 2043 includes changes due to the city's growth. Five new villages are added: Khomidok, Kairang, Heingang, Takhok Makha, and Keirao Makting. Villages near Marjing hills in the north-east will be included. Two new villages are added in the Irilbung area, inside the original boundary of the Iril River.

== Jurisdictions ==
The Greater Imphal Master Plan 2011 included Imphal city, 77 villages, and Langol Hill. For the 2043 plan, five new villages are added. Three villages—Khomidok, Kairang Muslim, and Heingang—are added to the north-east, and two villages—Takhok Makha and Keirao Makting—are added to the south-east. The area is divided into 7 zones and 51 sub-zones, including wards, villages, and towns.

== Towns and villages ==
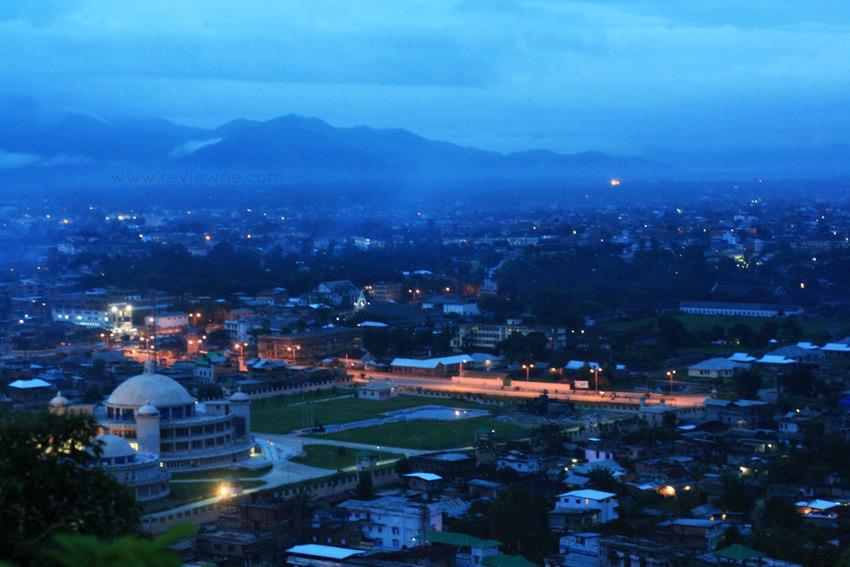
Imphal city is a part of the Greater Imphal.

The Master Plan for Greater Imphal covers the following villages of Imphal East Sub-Division and Imphal West Sub-Division in addition to the Imphal Municipal Area.

=== Imphal East ===
The Master Plan for Greater Imphal covers the following villages of Imphal East Sub-Division: Luwangsangbam, Asheiloklen, Matai, Achanbigei, Khabam, Lamlongei, Kontha Ahallup, Meitei Kairang, Konsam Leikai, Lairikyengbam Leikai, Laipham Siphai (Part), Khurai Sajor Leikai, Thongam Leikai,Laishram Leikai, Moirang Kampu, Bashikhong,Top Dusara (18),Laingampat, Ningthoubung, Khurai Chingambam Leikai, Khaidem Leikai, Kongkham Leikai(23), Porompat, Top Khongnangkhong, Top Naoriya, Kshetrigao, Naharup, Kongba Nongthomgbam Leikai, Ganga Pat, Keikhu Hao, Thangbrijao, Uchekon Khunou, Uchekon, Nandeibam Leikai, Khongman, Torban, Thongju, Kitna Pannung, Loumanbi, Wangkhei Loumanbi, Takhok Awang, Bamon Kampu, Machahal, Kiyamgei (68), Khomidok, Kairang Muslim, Lilong Hao, Heingang, Soibam Leikai (Part), Kongkham Leikai (Part), Takhok Makha, Keirao Makting, Kiyamgei (50), Kodompokpi (Part).

=== Imphal West ===
The Master Plan for Greater Imphal covers the following villages of Imphal West Sub-Division: Ghari, Langjing Achouba, Takyel Khongbal, Bijoy Govinda (Part), Lamjaotongba, Sagolband (Part), Sangaiprou(84), Langthabal Kunja (Part), Langthabal Mantrikhong, Meitram, Malom Tulihal, Malom Tuliyaima, Ningombam, Langthabal Lep, Mongsangei,Sangaiprou(45), Heinoukhongnembi, Naoriya Pakhanglakpa, Maibam Leikai, Sorokhaibam Leikai, Ahongshangbam Leikai, Oinam Thingel, Laiphrakpam Leikai, Naorem Leikai, Oinam Leikai, Changangei, Tabungkhok.

=== Boundaries ===
North	East	South	West
Imphal River, village boundaries of Heingang and Kairang along the foothills, northern boundary of Khomidok, Laishram Leikai and Moirang Kampu village.	Iril River.	Southern boundaries of Keirao Makting, Takhok Pankha, Kiyamgei Pangal, Lilong Hao, Kiyamgei (western boundary), MU Campus, Langthabal Lep, Ningombam, Imphal Airport, road leading from south-eastern corner of Imphal Airport to Tiddim Road via Mekola Bazaar.	Western boundaries of Meitram, Malom Tulihal, Malom Tuliyaima, Changangei, Tabungkhok, Langjing, Langol Hill up to Imphal river near Khonghampat.

== See also ==
- National Capital Region
