= Khurkhul dialect =

Khurkhul dialect (or, Khurkhun dialect) may refer to:

- Khurkhul (Meitei dialect), a living dialect of Meitei language
- Khurkhul (extinct dialect), a dialect once spoken in Khurkhul region, which was replaced by Meitei language
