= Andro dialect =

Andro dialect (or, Undro dialect) may refer to:

- Andro (Meitei dialect), a living dialect of Meitei language
- Andro (extinct dialect), a dialect once spoken in Andro region, which was replaced by Meitei language
