= Kakching dialect =

Dialect of Meitei language

Kakching
- Kakchīng
- ꯀꯛꯆꯤꯡ
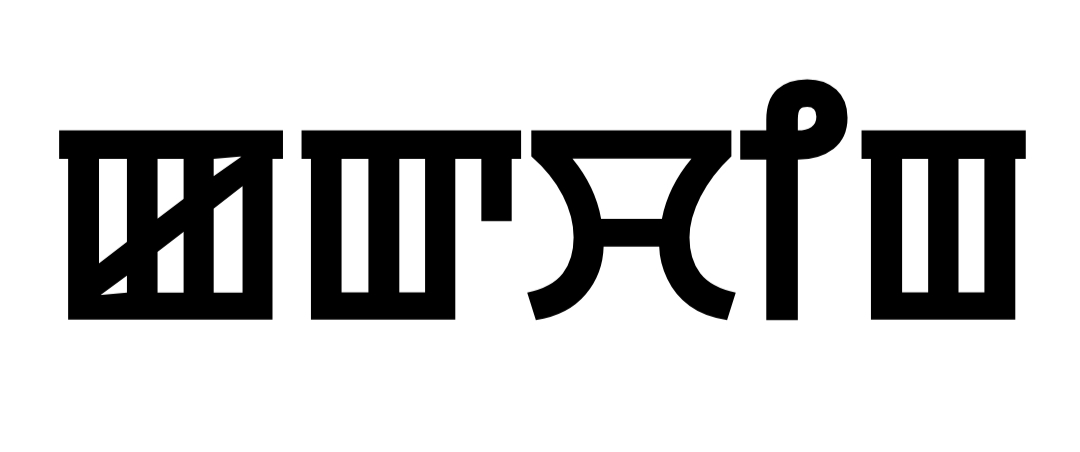
- Meitei Mayek transliteration of "Kakching"
- Native to: Manipur
- Region: Kakching
- Ethnicity: Meitei ethnicity
- Native speakers: 33170 (2011)
- Language family: Sino-Tibetan
- Early forms: Proto-Sino-Tibetan: Proto-Tibeto-Burman; Ancient Meitei
- Writing system: Meitei script

Language codes
- ISO 639-3: –
- Area in Manipur, where Kakching dialect is primarily used

Kakching (ꯀꯛꯆꯤꯡ) is a dialect of the Meitei language spoken in the Kakching region of Manipur. It shares many grammatical features with Standard Manipuri, (Note: also known as Standard Meitei or Standard Meiteilon, in different sources; it is based on the dialect spoken in Imphal.) but it also has several grammatical features that are different.

Unlike the Imphal dialect of Meitei, it is not heavily influenced by Sanskrit, Bengali and Hindi languages.

== Phonemic inventory ==
The Kakching dialect has sixteen consonant phonemes and six vowel phonemes.

=== Vowels ===
Kakching has a basic six-vowel system that is found in many Tibeto-Burman languages and their dialects. The six vowel phonemes are i, e, a, ā, o, and u.

These vowels are grouped into three levels of tongue height: high, mid, and low. They also show a three-way contrast between the front vowels i and e, the central vowels a and ā, and the back vowels o and u. They are also distinguished by the part of the tongue that is raised during pronunciation.

All vowel phonemes in the dialect are oral and voiced. Vowel length is not phonemic in the dialect.

=== Consonants ===
The Kakching dialect has sixteen consonant phonemes. According to their place of articulation, they are grouped into bilabial, alveolar, palatal, velar, and glottal consonants. According to their manner of articulation, they are grouped into stops, nasals, fricatives, a lateral, a trill, and semivowels.

The sixteen consonant phonemes include seven stops p, t, c, k, pʰ, tʰ, kʰ, two fricatives s and h, three nasals m, n, η, one lateral l, one trill r, and two semivowels w and y.

The consonant inventory of the Kakching dialect differs from that of Standard Manipuri. The dialect does not have the voiced stops b, d, g, and j, while Standard Manipuri has both the voiceless stops p, t, k, c and the voiced stops b, d, g, j. The Kakching dialect appears to have only the Proto-Tibeto-Burman stops *p, *t, *k, and *c. This is described as one of the main phonological features that distinguishes Kakching from Standard Manipuri.

The voiced stops b, d, g, j and the aspirated voiced stops bʰ, dʰ, gʰ occur only in loanwords and not in indigenous lexical items.

=== Diphthongs ===
Besides the six simple vowels, six diphthongs have been recorded in the Kakching dialect. These are ai, ui, ai, oi, au, and au.

== Tones ==
Tone refers to the distinctive pitch level of a syllable. Like many other Tibeto-Burman languages and dialects, the Kakching dialect is tonal. It has two tones, high and low. The tone system of Kakching is similar to that of Standard Manipuri.

== Distribution of phonemes ==
=== Vowels ===
Vowel phonemes do not occur in all three word positions. The vowels i, a, u, and o can occur in initial, medial, and final positions. The vowels e and ā occur only in medial and final positions.

=== Consonants ===
Not all consonant phonemes occur in every word position. Among the sixteen consonants, the voiceless unaspirated stops p, t, and k, the nasals m, n, η, and the liquids l and r occur in initial, medial, and final positions. The remaining consonants do not occur in all three positions. All consonant phonemes occur in word-initial and medial positions.

=== Syllable-initial consonants ===
Almost all consonants in the Kakching dialect can occur at the beginning of a syllable.

=== Syllable-final consonants ===
Only eight consonants occur at the end of a syllable in the Kakching dialect.

=== Diphthongs ===
Among the six diphthongs, ui, ai, and oi can occur in initial, medial, and final positions. All diphthongs can occur in medial and final positions.

=== Consonant clusters ===
A consonant cluster is a combination of two consonants within a syllable. According to Benedict (1972), Tibeto-Burman consonant clusters occur only at the beginning of roots and are of two types: stop or nasal followed by a liquid (r or l), and a consonant or consonant cluster followed by a semivowel (w or y).

The Kakching dialect allows a maximum of two consonants at the beginning of a syllable. No word begins with more than two consonants. Three-consonant clusters are not allowed in any position. Final consonant clusters are also not found in the dialect.

== Syllable structure ==
Like Standard Manipuri, a Kakching syllable consists of a nucleus that may be preceded by an onset or followed by a coda. The nucleus consists of either a vowel or a diphthong, while the onset may be simple or complex.

The most common syllable pattern in the dialect is CV. A single vowel can also form a syllable, a morpheme, and a word, as in i 'thatch' and à 'tree'. In this description, V represents a vowel and C represents a consonant.

== Digitization ==
Kakching dialect, along with Imphal dialect and Awang Sekmai dialect, are simultaneously used by the Central Institute of Indian Languages of the Government of India, in the compilation of the "Manipuri Raw Speech Corpus" (Catalogue Number: 1148), consisting of more than 156 hours of 66,231 audio segments of 620 speakers.

== See also ==
- Meitei grammar
- Amailon
- Thougallon
- Khuman language
- Moirang language
- Medieval Meitei language
- Modern Meitei language
- Kwatha dialect

== Bibliography ==
- Gupta, Deepak; Sambyo, Koj; Prasad, Mukesh; Agarwal, Sonali (2022-06-25). Advanced Machine Intelligence and Signal Processing. Springer Nature. pp. 698, 699. ISBN 978-981-19-0840-8.
- Biswas, Anupam; Wennekes, Emile; Hong, Tzung-Pei; Wieczorkowska, Alicja (2021-05-31). Advances in Speech and Music Technology: Proceedings of FRSM 2020. Springer Nature. pp. 424–433. ISBN 978-981-336-881-1.
- Mandal, J. K.; Saha, Goutam; Kandar, Debdatta; Maji, Arnab Kumar (2018-03-29). Proceedings of the International Conference on Computing and Communication Systems: I3CS 2016, NEHU, Shillong, India. Springer. pp. 296–304. ISBN 978-981-10-6890-4.
- Bera, Rabindranath; Sarkar, Subir Kumar; Chakraborty, Swastika (2018-05-23). Advances in Communication, Devices and Networking: Proceedings of ICCDN 2017. Springer. pp. 582, 587. ISBN 978-981-10-7901-6.
