= Imphal dialect =

Standard variety of Meitei language

Imphal
- Standard Meiteilon, Standard Manipuri
- ꯏꯝꯐꯥꯜ
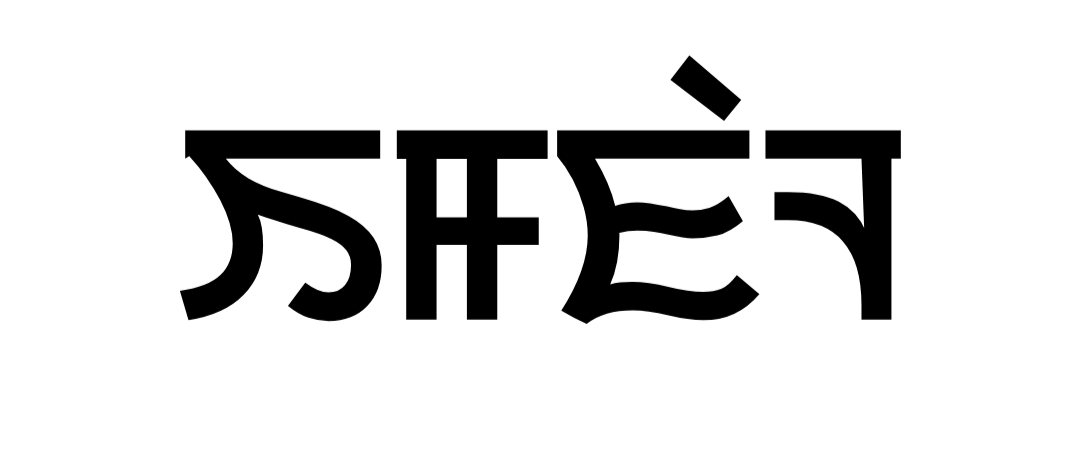
- Meitei Mayek transliteration of "Imphal"
- Pronunciation: US: /ˈɪmphʌl/
- Native to: Manipur
- Region: Greater Imphal (primarily Imphal city) and nearby areas
- Ethnicity: Meitei ethnicity
- Era: 1st century CE
- Language family: Sino-Tibetan
- Early forms: Ancient Meitei: Medieval Meitei
- Writing system: Meitei script and Bengali script

Official status
- Official language in: India (Manipur)
- Development body: Directorate of Language Planning and Implementation, Government of Manipur

Language codes
- ISO 639-3: –

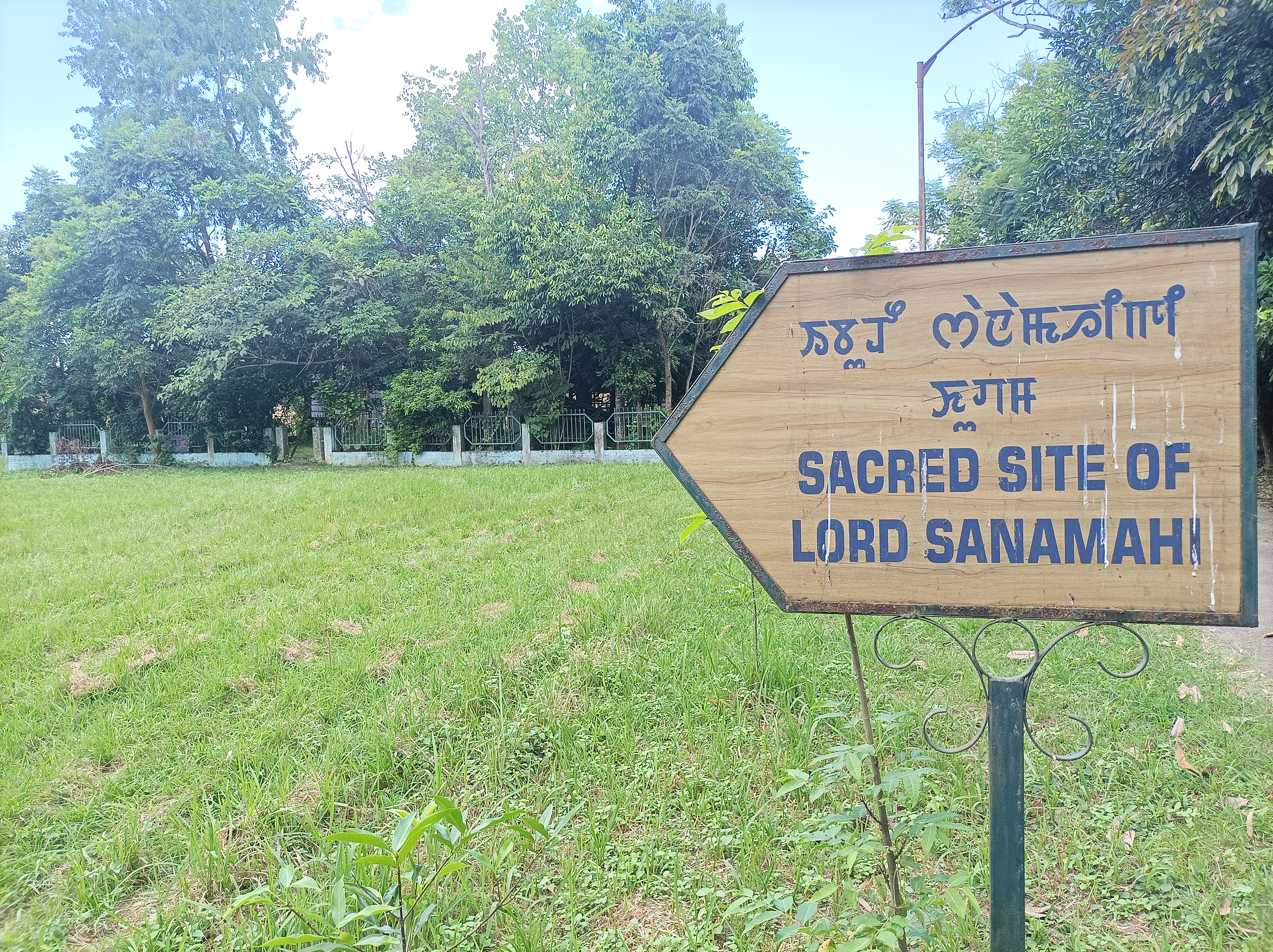
Meitei & English bilingual signs inside the Kangla of Imphal

Imphal dialect, also known as Standard Imphal dialect, or Meitei Proper, or Standard Meiteilon, or Standard Manipuri, is the standard dialect of Meitei language, officially known as Manipuri language. It is natively used in Imphal, the capital city of Manipur state, and is used in administration, education, media, literature, widely across the state and abroad. According to the reports of the Linguistic Survey of India, the Imphal dialect is the basis of the "literary language" of Manipur and its people.

Unlike other Meitei regional dialects in the outskirts of Imphal, it is heavily influenced by Sanskrit, Bengali and Hindi languages.

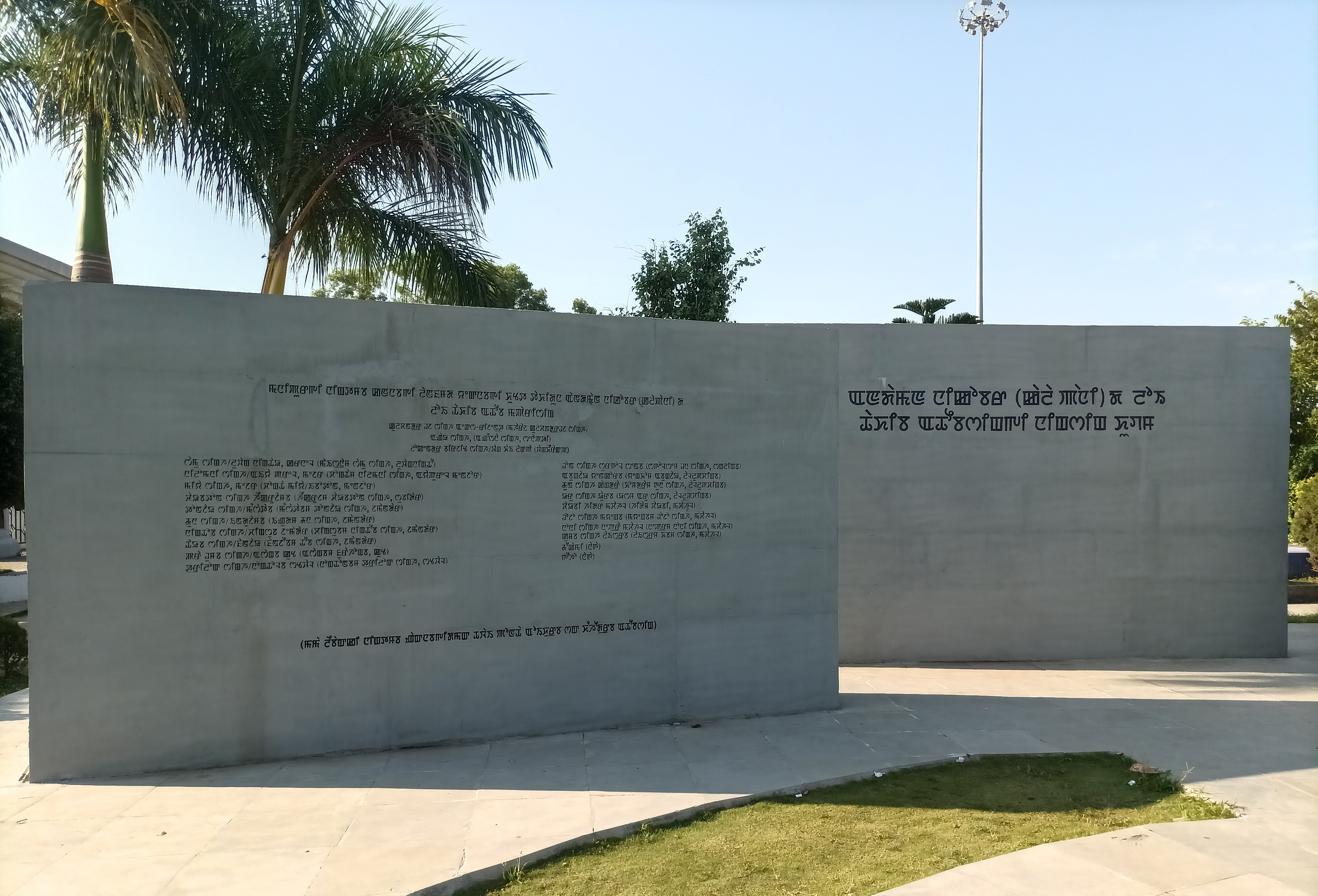
Meitei engravings in a monument in the Bir Tikendrajit Park of Imphal

Imphal dialect has six vowels, i.e. /ə/, /e/, /i/, /o/, /u/ and /a/, some diphthongs and monophthongs. Out of six vowels, the most frequently used vowel is /a/ in Imphal dialect.

The Imphal dialect marginally permits the interrogative to be suffixed to the bare verb stem for some verbs. While forms such as *čára from čá 'eat' and čátra from čát 'go' are clearly ungrammatical, speakers are ambivalent about forms like setra.

== History ==
The dialect of Imphal gradually emerged as the dominant form of Manipuri through historical and political developments. In the early period, around 33 CE, the Imphal valley of Manipur was divided into seven independent principalities, each with its own distinct dialect. Among them, the Ningthouja principality, whose capital was Imphal, steadily expanded its influence and eventually brought the other six principalities under its authority by the 12th century CE.

As the Ningthouja rulers strengthened their position through continuous political integration and intermarriage, the Imphal dialect gained wider acceptance and gradually evolved into the standard form of Manipuri. During this process, it also incorporated words and expressions from the dialects of the other principalities. This historical blending enriched the vocabulary of the language, resulting in numerous synonymous forms. In later periods, additional loanwords further contributed to the growth and development of the Manipuri lexicon.

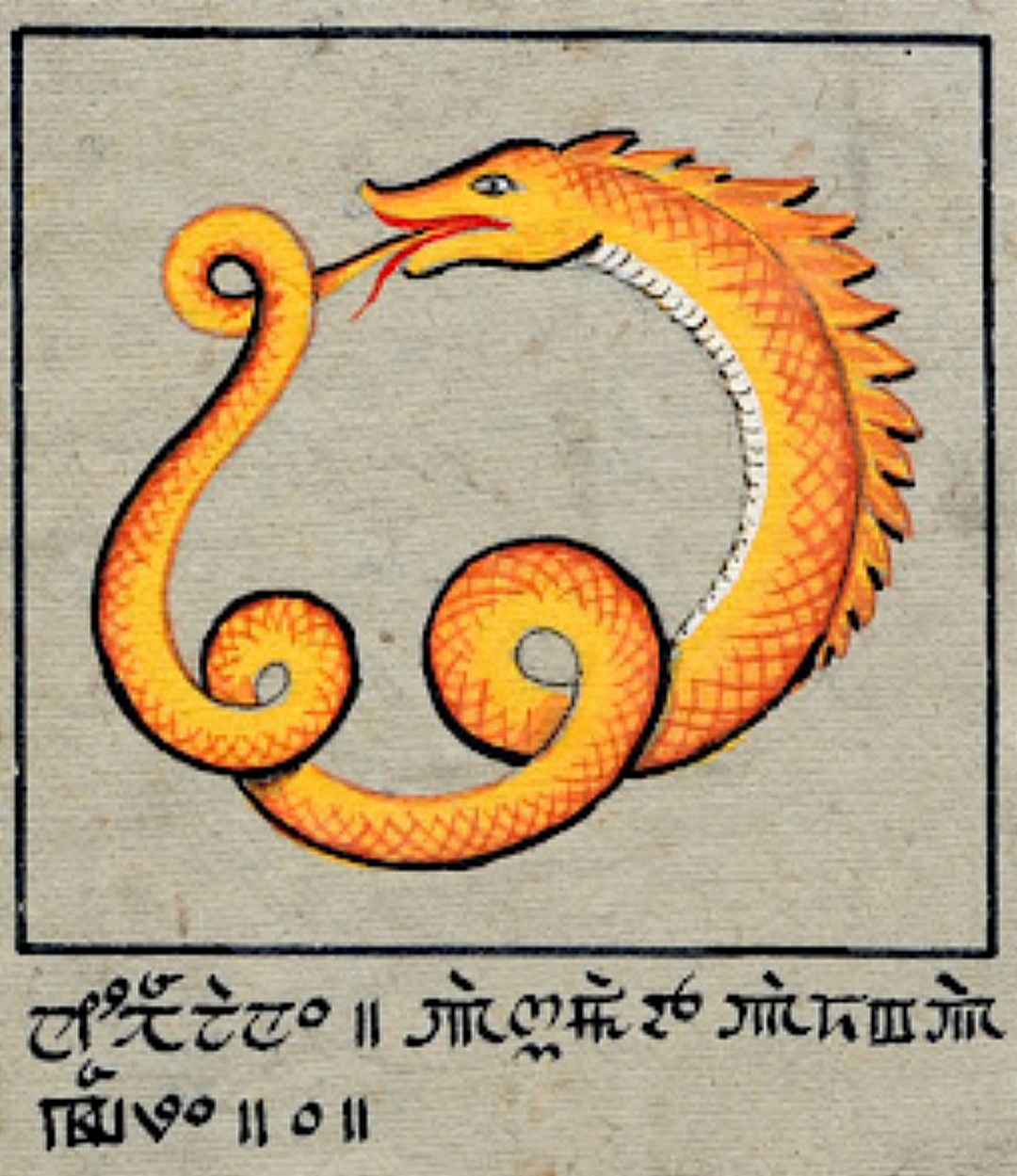
An ancient Meitei language text, describing the paphal of the Ningthoujas

== Geographical distribution ==
According to Nand Lal Sharma (1987), Standard Manipuri is the form of Meitei language, spoken in the Greater Imphal areas and adjoining districts in Manipur.

== Phonology ==
=== Consonants ===
There are both native sounds and borrowed sounds. Many voiced and aspirated sounds come from words borrowed from Indo-Aryan languages like Bengali and Hindi.

Some sounds change depending on position. For example, the sound /l/ can also be pronounced as a flap [r] between vowels. Some consonants appear only in borrowed words or ideophones. Native words do not usually begin with certain sounds like /a/.

=== Syllable structure ===
Each syllable has a beginning sound (onset), a vowel (nucleus), and sometimes an ending sound (coda). The vowel is always present. Onsets can be simple or complex. Some consonant combinations are allowed in native words, but voiced stops usually appear only in the middle of words or in borrowings. Syllables may end only with certain consonants like /p/, /t/, /k/, /m/, /n/, /ŋ/, or /l/. Complex endings do not occur.

== Tone ==
There are two tones: high and low. Tone is part of the root word. Affixes do not have their own tone. Instead, tone spreads through the word and changes pitch.

== Sound changes ==
Some sounds change when they occur between voiced sounds. Vowels may combine to form diphthongs, or a glide or glottal stop may be added to separate them. When a consonant-final word joins a vowel-initial suffix, the consonant may be copied to form a new syllable.

== Morphology ==
=== Gender and number ===
Gender and number are not required grammar categories. Gender is sometimes shown using suffixes -pi (female) and -pa (male), especially in kinship words and names.

Plural is marked by -sing, but it is not used with pronouns.

=== Nouns ===
Nouns use small markers (clitics) to show their role in a sentence, such as subject, object, location, or possession.

=== Possession ===
Possession is shown using prefixes i- (my), na- (your), and ma- (his/her). These are mainly used with family terms and body parts.

=== Verbs ===
Verbs are always bound forms and need endings to be complete. They show different moods such as:

- declarative
- imperative
- optative
- prohibitive
- permissive

Only one mood marker can be used at a time. Verbs can also take derivational suffixes that show direction, intensity, or aspect (like beginning or completion of an action). Verbs do not change for person, number, or gender.

=== Word formation ===
New nouns can be made from verbs using prefixes like ma- and khut-, and suffix -pa.

Nouns can also be joined to form compounds. Verb compounds are rare. Words can also be formed by repetition (reduplication) or by pairing with similar-sounding words.

=== Lexical categories ===
Nouns are free words, but verbs are bound. Verb roots can also form nouns, adjectives, and adverbs.

Adjectives and adverbs are made by adding prefixes or suffixes to verb roots. Some adverbs show place or time. Some time words are fixed compounds whose original parts are no longer clear. Auxiliary verbs can show meanings like starting, finishing, or possibility of an action.

=== Pronouns and demonstratives ===
Singular pronouns are áy (I), nón (you), and má (he/she). Plural forms use khoy. Dual forms use -bani, meaning "two people". There are no special relative pronouns. Instead, clauses are used directly. Reflexive pronouns use the word sá (“body”) with possessive prefixes. Demonstratives use -si (near) and -tu (far).

=== Question words and quantifiers ===
Question words all begin with ka- and can take normal noun endings. Quantifiers often begin with khV- and express meanings like “some” or “a little”.

== Syntax ==
A sentence has a verb and its required noun phrases. There is no separate verb phrase.

Word order is flexible, but the usual pattern is agent–verb. Some parts of the sentence can be left out when clear from context. Noun phrases must have a noun and may include adjectives. They may also include either a numeral or a quantifier, but not both. There are no numeral classifiers.

== Comparison with other dialects ==
In comparison, of the Imphal dialect with other dialects, regarding phonetics, Shobhana Lakshmi Chelliah found that the word "en" is from a non-standard dialect and is equivalent to the word "yen" in the Imphal dialect.

In a research on the traditional F2-F1 (in Hertz) taking mean values of F2 and F1 of all six vowels from the Imphal dialect as well as other two dialects, namely Kakching dialect and Sekmai dialect, with the vowels, /i/, /e/, /ə/, /a/, /o/, and /u/, F1 is vowel height, F2 is vowel front or back position, it is observed that the Imphal dialect's vowel space is larger than those of the other two dialects. The Imphal front vowels /i/ and /e/ have higher F2 value than the other two dialects. Imphal central-low vowel /ə/ is found almost similar in F1 and F2 values with the other two dialects. Imphal vowel /u/ has the lower F2 and F1 values than the two dialects.

== Digitization ==
Imphal dialect, along with Kakching dialect and Awang Sekmai dialect, are simultaneously used by the Central Institute of Indian Languages of the Government of India, in compiling the "Manipuri Raw Speech Corpus" (Catalogue Number: 1148), consisting of more than 156 hours of 66,231 audio segments of 620 speakers.

== See also ==
- Amailon
- Thougallon
- Khuman language
- Moirang language
- Kakching dialect
- Kwatha dialect
- Meitei language in Assam
- Meitei language in Bangladesh
- Meitei language in Tripura
- Chakpa language (Loi)
- Chairel language
- State Level Committee for declaration of Manipuri Language as Classical Language of India
