= National Capital Region =

National Capital Region may refer to:

- National Capital Region (Canada), Ottawa and the neighbouring city of Gatineau
- National Capital Region (India), centered on Delhi
- National Capital Region (Japan), the Greater Tokyo Area
- National Capital Region (Philippines), Metro Manila
- National Capital Region (United States), Washington metropolitan area

== See also ==
- Capital region, a region or district around a capital
