= Khurkhul =

Coordinates: 24.914°N 93.857°E

Khurkhul is a village in the Imphal West district in Manipur, India. It is located 22 km (14 mi) north of Lamphelpat and 20 km (12 mi) from the state capital Imphal. Khurkhul's pin code is 795002 and the postal head office is in Mantripukhri.

The total geographical area of village is 2,227.2 hectares (5,504 acres). Khurkhul has a total population of 6,450 people. There are about 1,344 houses in Khurkhul village. Sekmai Np is nearest town to Khurkhul, and is approximately 4 km (2.5 mi) away.
