= Central Institute of Indian Languages =

Indian research institute

- Central Institute of Indian Languages
- Abbreviation: CIIL
- Established: July 16, 1969; 57 years ago
- Type: Government Institution
- Purpose: Linguistics
- Location: Mysuru, India
- Parent organization: Ministry of Education (India)
- R.O.R. Id: 02zww6317
- Website: https://ciil.org

The Central Institute of Indian Languages (CIIL) is an Indian research and teaching institute based in Mysuru, part of the Language Bureau of the Ministry of Education. It was founded on 17 July 1969.

== Centres ==
The Central Institute of Indian Languages has seven centres:

- Centre for Classical Languages
- Centre for Tribal, Minor, Endangered Languages and Languages Policy
- Centre for Lexicography, Folklore, Literature and Translation Studies
- Centre for Literacy Studies
- Centre for Testing & Evaluation
- Centre for Materials Production, Publications and Sales
- Centre for Information in Indian Languages

== See also ==
- Language education
- Languages of India
- List of Language Self-Study Programs
