= Kwatha dialect =

Dialect of the Meitei language

Kwatha
- Kwāthā
- ꯀ꯭ꯋꯥꯊꯥ
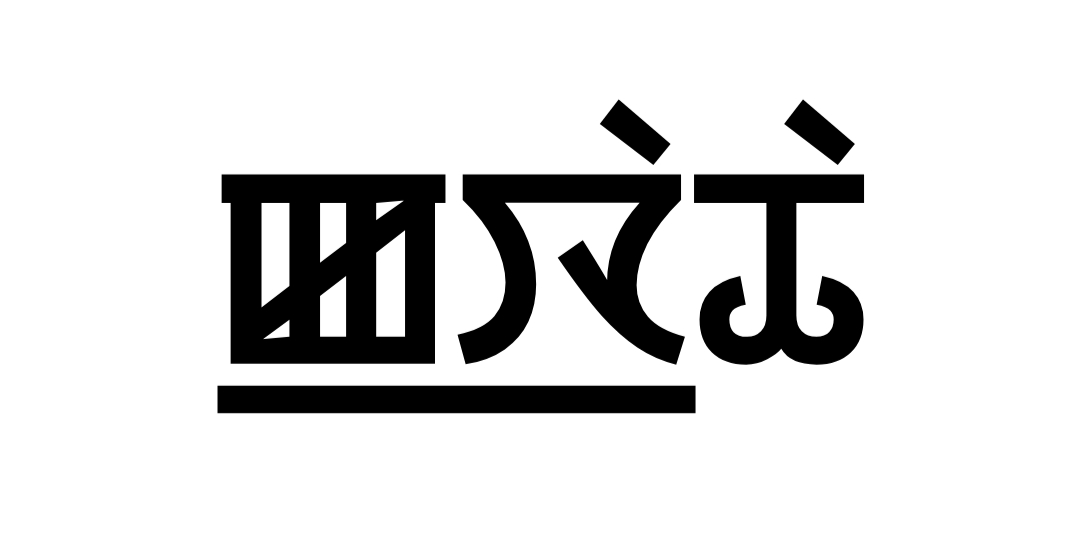
- Meitei Mayek transliteration of "Kwatha"
- Native to: Manipur
- Region: Kwatha village
- Ethnicity: Meitei ethnicity
- Era: 14th century till present (separated from the Meitei linguistic varieties spoken in the Imphal Valley, before the evolution of Medieval Meitei from Ancient Meitei)
- Language family: Sino-Tibetan
- Early form: Ancient Meitei
- Writing system: Meitei script

Language codes
- ISO 639-3: –

In linguistics, Kwatha (Meitei: ꯀ꯭ꯋꯥꯊꯥ) is a dialect of the Meitei language, officially known as Manipuri language. It is spoken in the small village of Kwatha, which is located on the Indo-Burma border near Moreh, about 109 kilometres south of Imphal. It is the only hill village in Manipur where the native Meitei speaking population lives. The village is surrounded by settlements of the Maring, Kuki, and Kom tribes.

Unlike the Imphal dialect of Meitei, it is not influenced by Sanskrit, Bengali and Hindi languages.

== History ==
Kwatha village has about 25 houses and a population of around 150 people. It is not known exactly when the people migrated from the Manipur's Imphal Valley to this hill village. According to tradition, they settled there during the reign of King Kiyamba of Kangleipak in the 14th century CE.

== Etymology ==
The name Kwatha comes from the roots kwa (or kva), meaning "betel nut", and tha, meaning "to grow" in Meitei language. The village is the only place in Manipur where areca nut trees grow in large numbers.

== Dialectal differences ==
The differences between the Kwatha dialect and Standard Manipuri dialect (based in Imphal) are mainly of four types:

- Phonological differences
- Differences in sandhi changes in compounding
- Differences in sandhi changes in inflection
- Lexical differences

Overall, the Kwatha dialect is more conservative because many of the sandhi changes found in the Standard dialect do not occur in Kwatha. This may be the result of the dialect remaining isolated in the hill village for several hundred years. However, the Kwatha dialect also has some innovative sandhi changes.

== Phonological differences ==
The most notable phonological difference between the two dialects is that the level tone of the Standard dialect regularly corresponds to a falling-rising tone in the Kwatha dialect.

It has been found that a word juncture must be established in the Standard dialect to explain the contrast between certain sets of forms. The distinction between the sounds r and l is considered superficial in both dialects. Generally, r occurs between vowels and between a semivowel and a vowel, while l occurs elsewhere. When preceded by the prefix e, l changes to r in the Standard dialect but not in the Kwatha dialect. In word-final position, the sounds l and n occur in free variation in both dialects. In addition, syllable-final n changes to l in both dialects when followed by l. The two dialects also differ in the treatment of vowel clusters. The Kwatha dialect allows vowel clusters to remain unchanged during sandhi formation, while the Standard dialect inserts a glide to separate the vowels. The inserted glide is y when the second vowel is i, and w when the second vowel is u or o. The vowel o may optionally take a glide in word-initial position in the Standard dialect, but not in the Kwatha dialect. Likewise, when o is preceded by the semivowels y or w, the Standard dialect inserts a glide, while the Kwatha dialect does not.

== Sandhi changes in compounding ==
The sandhi changes found in compounding are generally irregular. A root may undergo a change in some compounds but not in others without any clear reason.

In the Standard dialect, the voiceless stops p, t, c, and k become voiced when they are preceded by a voiced sound. This change is more common when the preceding root begins with an aspirated stop or a fricative. This change does not occur in the Kwatha dialect. In the Standard dialect, the aspirated stops ph, th, and kh become de-aspirated, and the fricative s changes into the corresponding affricate when they are preceded by a syllable containing an initial aspirated sound or a fricative. These resulting sounds also undergo the voicing changes described above where appropriate. These changes are not found in the Kwatha dialect. There are also several minor sandhi changes that occur only in the Standard dialect. For example, when followed by k or kh (both of which become g), the nasal n changes in nine cases, and the nasal m changes to n in two cases. The final t of the root khut ("hand") is deleted in some compounds. These and other minor changes occur only in the Standard dialect.

== Sandhi changes in inflection ==
The sandhi changes connected with inflection are generally regular. However, they apply only to certain affixes that satisfy the required morphological conditions.

== Voicing ==
In compounding, the voicing of the voiceless stops p, t, c, and k is irregular and occurs only in the Standard dialect.

A similar voicing change occurs in inflection, but it is regular and occurs in both the Standard and Kwatha dialects. In the Kwatha dialect, the consonants b and g further change into the corresponding nasals m and ng when they are preceded by a nasal.

== Deaspiration and affrication ==
Another sandhi change shared by compounding and inflection is the deaspiration of the syllable-initial aspirated stops th and kh, together with the affrication of the syllable-initial s, when these sounds are preceded by a syllable containing an initial aspirated sound or a fricative.

Unlike the voicing change, these changes occur only in the Standard dialect and not in the Kwatha dialect. These changes are irregular in compounding but regular in inflection for the relevant suffixes. The resulting sounds t, k, and c become voiced after voiced sounds in inflection, just as they do in compounding.

== Assimilation ==
Assimilation of a suffix-initial l to the preceding consonant occurs only in the Standard dialect and only in inflection. This happens when the preceding consonant is p, m, or n.

The affected suffixes are:

- li – present progressive
- le – present perfect
- lo – persuasion
- loy – future negative
- le – movement towards the speaker (action after movement)
- lu – movement away from the speaker (action after movement)
- lek – movement towards the speaker (action before movement)

== Deletion ==
The initial l of the suffixes listed above, except lek, is deleted after syllables ending in k in the Standard dialect. In the Kwatha dialect, the l is retained.

The suffixes li ("past") and lu ("command") are exceptions. They show a different set of sandhi changes, and these changes occur in both dialects. There are also two related sandhi changes that occur only in the Kwatha dialect and not in the Standard dialect.

== Lexical differences ==
In the first-person pronominal prefix used with kinship terms to indicate possession, the Kwatha dialect distinguishes between relatives who are older than the speaker and those who are younger or of the same age.

In the Standard dialect, the prefix l is used for all kinship terms. In the Kwatha dialect, the prefix l is used only for younger relatives and relatives of the same age, while the prefix e is used for relatives who are older than the speaker.

== See also ==
- Amailon
- Thougallon
- Khuman language
- Moirang language
- Medieval Meitei language
- Modern Meitei language
