= Loi =

Indigenous people of Manipur, India

Loi is the word in the Meitei language (Meiteilon) for the term "scheduled caste". The term Loi is given to the indigenous and aboriginal people of Manipur in northeast India who refused to adopt Hinduism or were semi-Hinduised when the newly converted Manipuri king ordered all his subjects to adopt the religion.

The Chakpa language is also known as Loi. Although Chakpa people are usually considered to be Loi, not all Loi are Chakpa.

There are two kinds of Loi according to Parratt (1998):

- tributary tribes conquered by the Meitheis
- outcast people from Meithei society who were banished to Loi villages
