= Amailon =

Liturgical variety of Meitei

- Amailol
- ꯑꯃꯥꯏꯂꯣꯟ
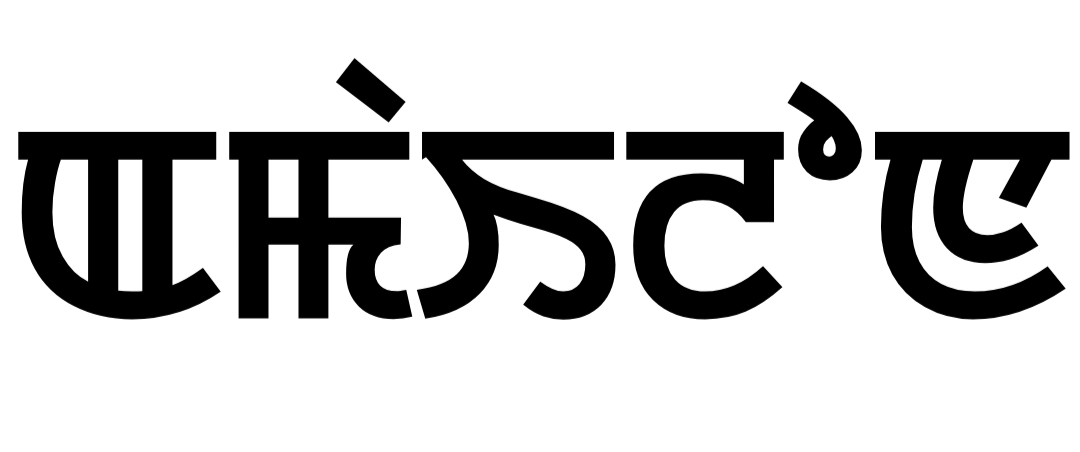
- Meitei Mayek transliteration of "Amailon"
- Native to: Manipur
- Ethnicity: Meitei
- Native speakers: Maibi and Nupa Maibi, ritual practitioners of the traditions of Sanamahism
- Language family: Sino-Tibetan: Central Tibeto-Burman?; Kuki-Chin–Naga?; Amailon
- Early form: Proto-Sino-Tibetan
- Writing system: Meitei script and rarely Bengali script

Official status
- Official language in: Ancient Kangleipak
- Recognised minority language in: Manipur
- Development body: Sanamahism based organizations

Language codes
- ISO 639-3: –

Amailon (ꯑꯃꯥꯏꯂꯣꯟ), also known as Amailol (ꯑꯃꯥꯏꯂꯣꯜ), is a liturgical variety of the Meitei language, spoken by Maibi and Nupa Maibi, ritual practitioners of the Sanamahi tradition in Manipur, Northeast India. It is used exclusively in ceremonial and ritual contexts and has no daily spoken form.

Amailon is mentioned in the holy and sacred ancient Meitei language manuscript text called the Wakoklon Heelel Thilel Salai Amailon Pukok Puya (WHTSAP puya).

== Linguistic context ==
Amailon is part of the Meitei language, also known as Meetei, Meithei, or Manipuri, which serves as the dominant language of Manipur and functions as a regional lingua franca. The language is characterized by specialized vocabulary and archaic forms that are used in religious and ritual performances rather than in everyday communication.

Within the Sanamahi tradition, there is a distinction between male and female ritual practitioners. Maiba or Amaiba refers to a male priest, Maibi or Amaibi refers to a female priestess, and Nupa Maibi denotes a male-bodied individual who performs roles typically associated with Maibi. Amailon is specifically associated with these practitioners and forms the medium for ritual chants, songs, and ceremonial texts.

== Ritual use ==
Amailon is transmitted orally and is primarily used in high ritual contexts, including sacred dances, chants, and ceremonial performances of Sanamahi worship. The language encodes ritual knowledge, symbolic meanings, and metaphorical expressions that are essential to the practice of Sanamahi rites. Its restricted use means that the survival of Amailon is closely tied to the presence of trained ritual practitioners.

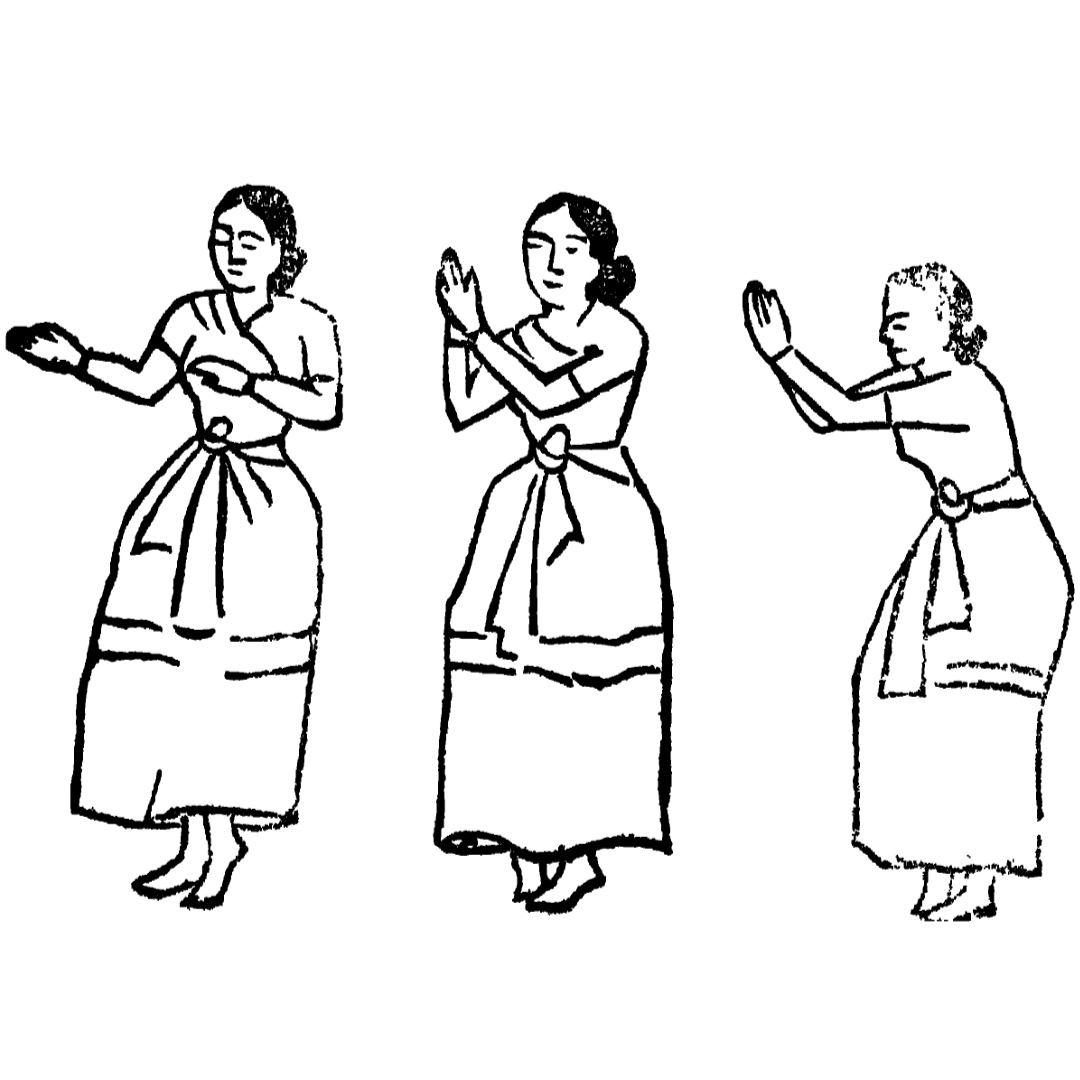
Scenes of Amaibis (priestesses) performing rituals uttering Amailon words

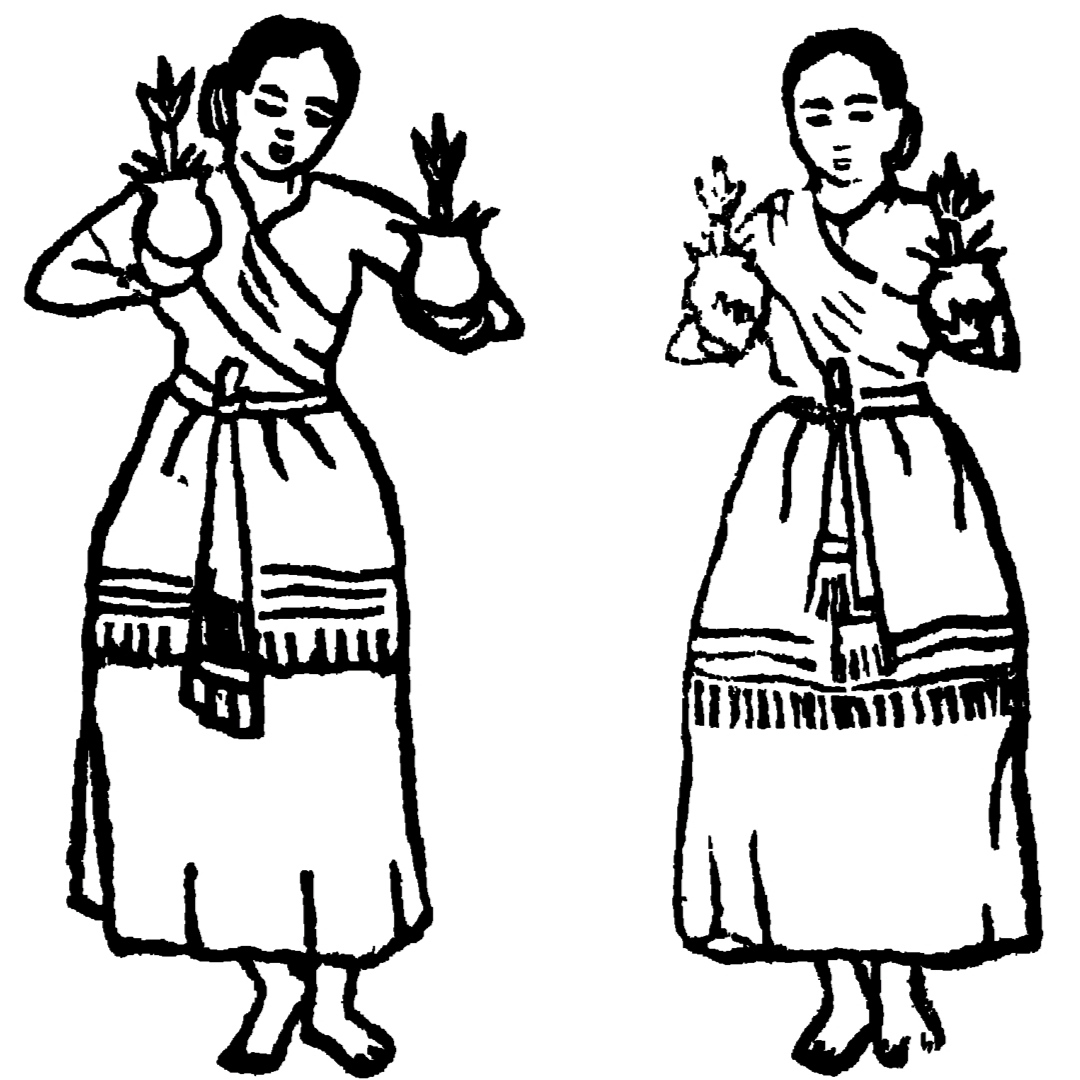
Amailon is chanted while Amaibis perform rituals

== Endangerment ==
Amailon is considered critically endangered. The number of fluent practitioners is extremely small, limited to members of the Nupa Maibi community. Historical disruptions, including the introduction of Vaishnavism in the eighteenth century and the replacement of the traditional Meitei Mayek script with Bengali script, have contributed to the decline of ritual literacy and indigenous practices. Contemporary influences from Hindi, Bengali language, and English, combined with sociopolitical instability and military presence in Manipur, have further affected the transmission of the language.

The oral nature of Amailon and the scarcity of practitioners make the language highly vulnerable. The death of senior priestesses results in the loss of knowledge, as much of the language contains complex metaphorical and symbolic elements that are not documented elsewhere.

== Preservation and documentation ==
Documentation of Amailon has focused on recording ritual texts, chants, and performances while collaborating with Nupa Maibi to preserve their cultural and spiritual knowledge. Efforts aim to support both linguistic research and the continuation of Sanamahi ritual practices. The revival of the Meitei Mayek script in schools and the growing interest in indigenous cultural heritage contribute to broader preservation strategies.

The protection of Amailon is also linked to the safeguarding of the social and cultural roles of gender-diverse ritual practitioners. As integral figures within Sanamahi worship, Maibi and Nupa Maibi play central roles in maintaining the religious and cultural identity of their communities. Systematic documentation, combined with intergenerational transmission, is considered essential for the survival of both the language and the associated ritual knowledge.

== See also ==
- Wakoklon Heelel Thilel Salai Amailon Pukok Puya
- Thougallon
- Ancient Khuman language
- Ancient Moirang language
- Ancient Meitei literature
- Ancient Meitei hymns
- Meitei ritual songs
- Meitei philosophy
- Philosophy of Sanamahism
