= Thougallon =

- Meitei royal language
- ꯊꯧꯒꯜꯂꯣꯟ
- (Meitei royalty)
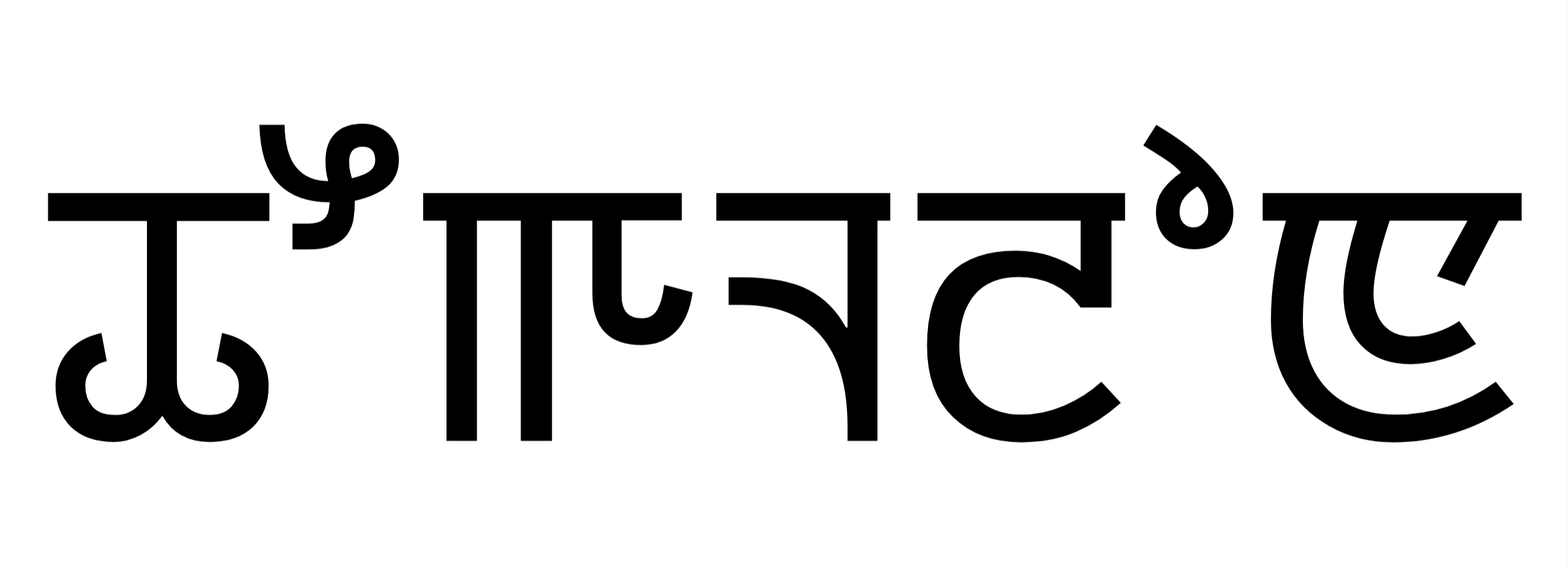
- Classical Meitei Mayek transliteration of "Thougallon"
- Created by: Meitei royal etiquette
- Ethnicity: Meitei ethnicity
- Users: Meitei royalties and nobles (Ningthouja dynasty, Khuman dynasty, Luwang dynasty, and others from the Meitei confederacy); Meitei people (while talking to the royalties and nobles)
- Purpose: Sino-Tibetan
- Early forms: Proto-Sino-Tibetan: Proto-Sino-Tibetan; Proto-Tibeto-Burman; Proto-Meitei; Ancient Meitei language
- Writing system: Meitei script, Bengali script

Official status
- Development body: Department of Art and Culture, Government of Manipur

Language codes
- ISO 639-3: –

Thougallon (ꯊꯧꯒꯜꯂꯣꯟ), also known as Thougallol (ꯊꯧꯒꯜꯂꯣꯜ), is the formal court register of the Meitei language, historically used in the royal administration, religious ceremonies, and classical literature of the Meitei civilization in Manipur Kingdom. It is characterized by its structured syntax, ceremonial vocabulary, and use of honorific expressions. Thougallon functioned as a medium for official communication within the court and in the composition of ritual and scholarly texts, often written in the traditional Meitei Mayek script. It is distinct from the vernacular forms of Meitei spoken by the general population and reflects the stratified linguistic practices of pre-modern Meitei society.

== Etymology ==
Etymologically, the Meitei language term "Thougallon" (ꯊꯧꯒꯜꯂꯣꯟ; /tʰəu.gəl.lón/) is composed of thou (“duty” or “obligation”), gal, derived from kal (“to serve”), and lon (“language” or “speech”), collectively conveying the sense of a “language of duty and service.”

== Application of term ==
Thougallon (ꯊꯧꯒꯜꯂꯣꯟ; /tʰəu.gəl.lón/) denotes both (1) a specialized form of speech used in royal and aristocratic contexts, as well as (2) a codified system of etiquette governing verbal conduct in the presence of figures of authority, such as kings, ministers, and nobles. Thougallon functioned not merely as a linguistic variety but also as a normative framework prescribing appropriate modes of address, honorific usage, and ritualized expressions required in formal court settings. It is a medium through which social hierarchy, respect, and loyalty were formally articulated. Through its structured vocabulary and prescribed usage, Thougallon reinforced court protocol and symbolized adherence to the political and cultural order of the Meitei royal court.

== Spread ==
Thougallon, the royal register of the Meitei language, originated within the royal dynasties of Manipur. Historically, it was predominantly used by the monarchy; however, its use gradually extended beyond the royal court. This shift occurred as commoner women ascended to positions as queens or palace attendants, and princesses married men from non-royal families, facilitating increased social interaction and cultural exchange between the royalty and commoners.

== Vocabulary ==
Words	Latin transliterations	Vernacular Meitei equivalents	Latin transliterations	English translations	Note(s)
ꯆꯥꯏꯊꯕ	chaaithaba	ꯏꯔꯨꯖꯕ	irujaba	to bath	
ꯂꯦꯡꯕ	lengba	ꯆꯠꯄ	chatpa	to go or to move	
ꯂꯦꯡꯈꯠꯄ	lengkhatpa	ꯍꯧꯒꯠꯄ	hougatpa	to arise	
ꯊꯣꯟꯕ	thonba	ꯁꯦꯠꯄ/ꯆꯤꯟꯕ	setpa / chinba	to wear / to adorn	
ꯍꯥꯕ	haaba	ꯆꯥꯕ	chaaba	to eat	
ꯐꯥꯟꯕ	phaanba / faanba	ꯊꯛꯄ	thakpa	to drink	
ꯃꯤꯠꯌꯦꯡ ꯇꯥꯕ	mityeng taaba	ꯌꯦꯡꯕ	yengba	to see / to watch / to look	
ꯍꯪꯒꯠꯄ	hang-gatpa	ꯍꯥꯏꯖꯕ	haaijaba	to say / pray	
ꯆꯤꯟ ꯀꯨꯞꯄ	chin kuppa	ꯆꯤꯟ ꯇꯦꯡꯕ	chin tengba	to brush teeth / to wash mouth	
ꯈꯥꯡꯖꯦꯠ	khaangjet	ꯐꯩꯖꯣꯝ	pheijom / feijom	traditional Meitei loincloth worn by men	
ꯀꯣꯛꯊꯣꯟ	kokthon	ꯀꯣꯛꯌꯦꯠ / ꯂꯨꯍꯨꯞ	kokyet / luhup	traditional Meitei headdress worn by men	
ꯈꯨꯗꯥ	khudaa	ꯐꯤꯗꯥ	phidaa / fidaa	cushion	
ꯅꯝꯈꯥꯡ	namkhaang	ꯐꯨꯔꯤꯠ / ꯏꯟꯅꯐꯤ	phurit / innaphi	coat / shawl	phurit is actually translated as shirt, but also can be interpreted as coat, while innaphi is a clothing to be wrapped around the upper body as outerwear, and not innerwear, and can be loosely translated as shawl
ꯁꯪꯒꯥꯏ	sang-gaai / shang-gaai	ꯌꯨꯝ	yum	house / building	
ꯈꯨꯗꯣꯡ	khudong	ꯍꯤꯗꯥꯛꯐꯨ / ꯍꯤꯗꯥꯛꯄꯨ	hidaakphu / hidaakpu	smoking pipe / hookah	
ꯂꯨꯛ	luk / look	ꯆꯥꯛ	chaak	meal	
ꯆꯦꯞꯄ	cheppa	ꯍꯤꯞꯄ	hippa	to sleep/lay down	
ꯌꯥꯝꯕꯨꯡ	yaambung	ꯇꯥꯗ	taada	elder brother	
ꯏꯆꯦꯝ ꯁꯤꯖ	ichem sija / ichem shija	ꯏꯆꯦ	eeche	elder sister	
ꯏꯆꯜ ꯏꯕꯦꯝꯃ / ꯏꯆꯟ ꯏꯕꯦꯝꯃ	ichal ibemma / ichan ibemma	ꯏꯆꯜ / ꯏꯆꯟ	eechal / eechan	younger sister	

=== For the kings exclusively ===
Words	Latin transliterations	Vernacular Meitei equivalents	Latin transliterations	English translations	Note(s)
ꯁꯛꯌꯦꯡ ꯃꯤꯡꯁꯦꯜ	shakyeng mingshel / sakyeng mingsel	ꯃꯤꯡꯁꯦꯜ	mingshel / mingsel	mirror / looking glass	
ꯁꯅꯥ ꯈꯣꯡꯅꯦꯠ ꯁꯥ	sana khongnet saa	ꯁꯒꯣꯜ / ꯁꯃꯨ	sagol / samu	horse / elephant	In classical terminology, sana khongnet saa means "the animal deemed to be mounted by the royalty". Sagol / Shagol means horse and Samu / Shamu means elephant.
ꯁꯅꯥ ꯈꯨꯠꯁꯨ ꯊꯥꯡ	sana khutsu thang	ꯊꯥꯡ	thang	sword	

== See also ==
- Ancient Meitei literature
- Ancient Khuman language
- Ancient Moirang language
- Ancient Meitei hymns
- Meitei ritual songs
- Meitei literature
- Meitei proverbs
- Meitei grammar
