= Moirang dialect =

Dialect of Meitei

Moirang
- Moilang
- ꯃꯣꯏꯔꯥꯡ
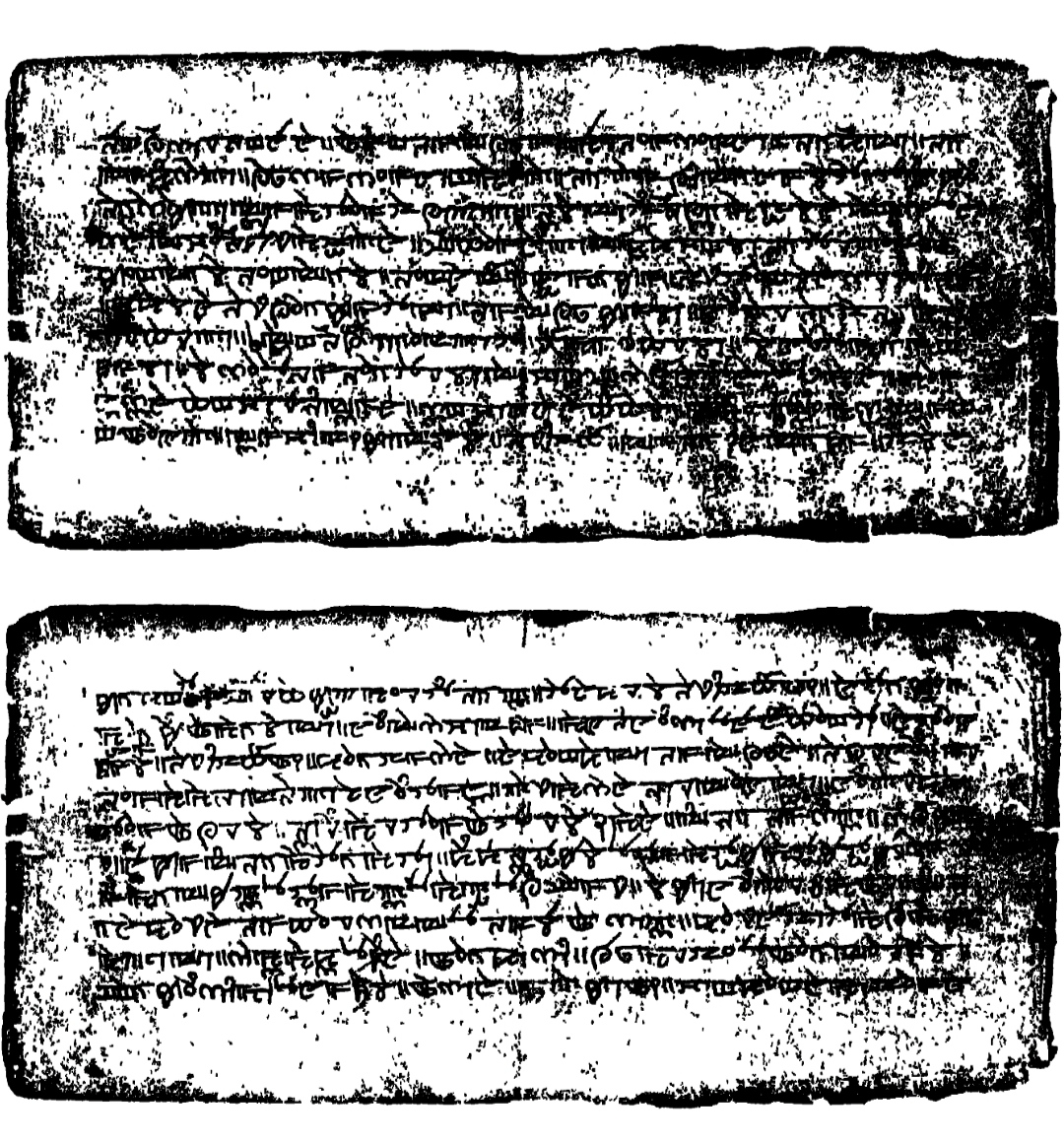
- Vast majority of the traces of Moirang linguistically originated words are found in the ancient Meitei language manuscript texts (PuYas), written about the Moirang Kangleirol traditions
- Region: Moirang kingdom
- Ethnicity: Moirangs
- Extinct: merged into Meitei language
- Language family: Sino-Tibetan: Central Tibeto-Burman?; Kuki-Chin–Naga?; Meitei; Moirang
- Writing system: Meetei Mayek

Official status
- Official language in: Moirang kingdom
- Development body: Moirang clan

Language codes
- ISO 639-3: –

Moirang (ꯃꯣꯏꯔꯥꯡ), also known as Moilang (ꯃꯣꯏꯂꯥꯡ), is a historical dialectal variety of the Meitei language (also known as Manipuri) associated with the Moirang clan and its former Moirang kingdom. The Moirang polity was one of the seven principal Yek Salai clans within the traditional Meitei confederacy. Historically prominent in ancient Moirang, this dialect exerted a notable influence on the development of Meitei by contributing a distinct lexical stratum. Vocabulary of Moirang origin is frequently attested in classical Meitei manuscripts and early literary sources. Owing to these characteristics, the Moirang dialect has attracted sustained scholarly attention, particularly in Tibeto-Burman linguistics, where it is examined for evidence relevant to the historical evolution, internal variation, and clan-based stratification of the Meitei language.

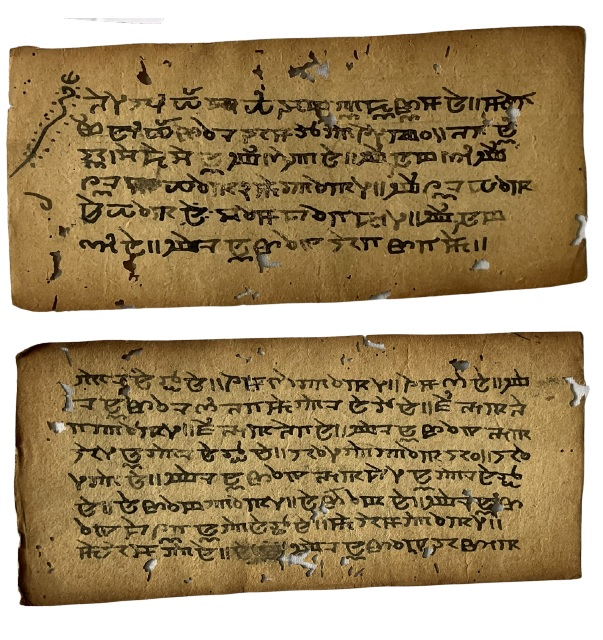
Moirang Ningthourol Yimtapa (alias Moilang Ningthoulol Yimtapa), an Ancient Meitei language manuscript text, in traditional Meetei Mayek script, about the kings of the Moirang kingdom

== Vocabularies ==
Moirang words	Latin transliterations	Equivalents in another variant/dialect of Meitei language	Latin transliterations	English translation	Note(s)
ꯂꯥꯏꯖ	laija	ꯇꯔꯪ	tarang	water	it is often collectively said as tarang laija, in which tarang is originated from Khuman (linguistics) speech, as a part of semantic reduplication in Meitei vocabulary
ꯇꯥꯏꯄꯪ	taipang	ꯃꯤ	mee/mi	human being	it is often collectively said as taipang mi, in which mee/mi is originated from Ningthouja/Mangang speech, as a part of semantic reduplication in Meitei vocabulary
ꯑꯔꯛ	arak	ꯑꯈꯪ	akhang	suddenly	it is often collectively said as arak akhang, in which akhang is originated from Ningthouja/Mangang speech, as a part of semantic reduplication in Meitei vocabulary
ꯆꯤꯡꯉꯨ/ꯆꯤꯉꯨ	chingu	ꯂꯥꯏ	lai	god/divine being	it is often collectively said as chingu lai, in which lai is originated from Ningthouja/Mangang speech, as a part of semantic reduplication in Meitei vocabulary
ꯁꯋꯥ	sawa	ꯎꯆꯦꯛ	uchek	bird	it is often collectively said as uchek sawa or sawa uchek, in which uchek is originated from Ningthouja/Mangang speech, as a part of semantic reduplication in Meitei vocabulary

=== Comparison with Modern Meitei equivalents ===
Moiraang vocabulary comparison
Word from Pre-20th Century Manuscripts, used predominantly by the Moirang people	Modern Meitei Word	English Gloss
haypi	iŋjəŋ	axe
koŋ	kəŋphal	land
loklaw	isiŋ	water

== Literary sources ==
- Somarendro, Maibramcha (2006). Kege Pung Ngangoi Lammitlon Moirang Thanjing Chinggailon (in Manipuri). Internet Archive; Digital Library of India.
- Manijao, Ningonba (1980). Kege Chaina Pung (in Manipuri). Internet Archive; Digital Library of India.
- Sabita Devi (1982). Moirang Kangleirol (in Manipuri). Digital Library of India; Internet Archive.
- Nodia, Ngangoimcha (2009). Moirang Ningthourol (in Manipuri). Digital Library of India; Internet Archive.
- Amubi, Irom (1994). Moirang Kangleirol (in Manipuri). Digital Library of India; Internet Archive.
- Nodia, Ngangoimcha (1996). Moirang Kangleirol Lambuba Part1 (in Manipuri). Internet Archive; Digital Library of India.
- Bhogeshwar, Oinam (1982). Moirang Ningthourol Lambuba (in Manipuri). Internet Archive; Digital Library of India.
- Bhogeshwar, Oinam (1988). Moirang Ningthoural Lambuba Part2 (in Manipuri). Digital Library of India; Internet Archive.
- Mangi Singh, laishram (1980). Moirang Kangleiron Khuman Khamba Seitharol (in Manipuri). Digital Library of India; Internet Archive.
- Gouramani, Kabrambam (1963-02-25). Khamba Thoibi Ahanba Saruk (in Manipuri). Manipur University Library, Imphal; North Eastern States Libraries. India: Digital Library of India; Internet Archive.
- Pramodini (1992). Khuman Khamba (in Manipuri). Manipur University Library, Imphal; North Eastern States Libraries. India: Digital Library of India; Internet Archive.
- Bormani, Sarangthem (2003). Moirang Shaion (in Manipuri). Manipur University Library, Imphal; North Eastern States Libraries. India: Digital Library of India; Internet Archive.

== See also ==
- List of rulers of Moirang
- Moirang Ningthourol Lambuba
- Chothe Thangwai Pakhangba
- Epic cycles of incarnations in Moirang
- Moirang Sai
- Moirang Kangla
