= Department of Manipuri =

Department of Manipuri may refer to:

- Department of Manipuri, Assam University
- Department of Manipuri, Dhanamanjuri University
- Department of Manipuri, Gauhati University
- Department of Manipuri, Lanka Mahavidyalaya
- Department of Manipuri, Manipur University
