= Sunil Kumar Kohli =

Indian civil servant

S.K Kohli

Financial Advisor Defence Services
- In office 30 September 2016 – 31 August 2018
- Preceded by: Shobhana Joshi
- Succeeded by: Madhulika P. Sukul

Personal details
- Born: Sunil Kumar Kohli; 17 August 1958 (age 68) Punjab, India
- Education: D.A.V College Amristar & Dept of Law, University of Punjab

Sunil Kumar Kohli (S. K. Kohli) (born 17 August 1958), a senior Bureaucrat of Indian Civil Services, was the Financial Advisor, Defence Services (FADS). S.K Kohli was the 46th Controller General of Defence Accounts CGDA, Ministry of Defence, of the Republic of India. He is from 1981 batch IDAS (Indian Defence Accounts Department )cadre. He was Addl CGDA, and Principal controller at Delhi and before that he served as Joint Secretary in Ministry of Water Resources and is a graduate from D.A.V College Amristar, Guru Nanak University and holds an LL.B. Degree from University of Punjab. He holds a Degree from National Defence College, New Delhi on Defence Strategic Studies. He, as FADS, was mandated to advise the Ministry of Defence regarding both Capital and Revenue expenditures and Defence Budget of Govt. of India.He is a Defence finance analyst. He superannuated on 31 August 2018, succeeded by Smt.Madhulika P. Sukul, IDAS(1982).

Preceded by Shobhana Joshi	CGDA	Succeeded by N NEIHSIAL

== See also ==
- Indian Defence Accounts Service
