= List of institutions of higher education in Manipur =

This is a list of institutions of higher education in Manipur.

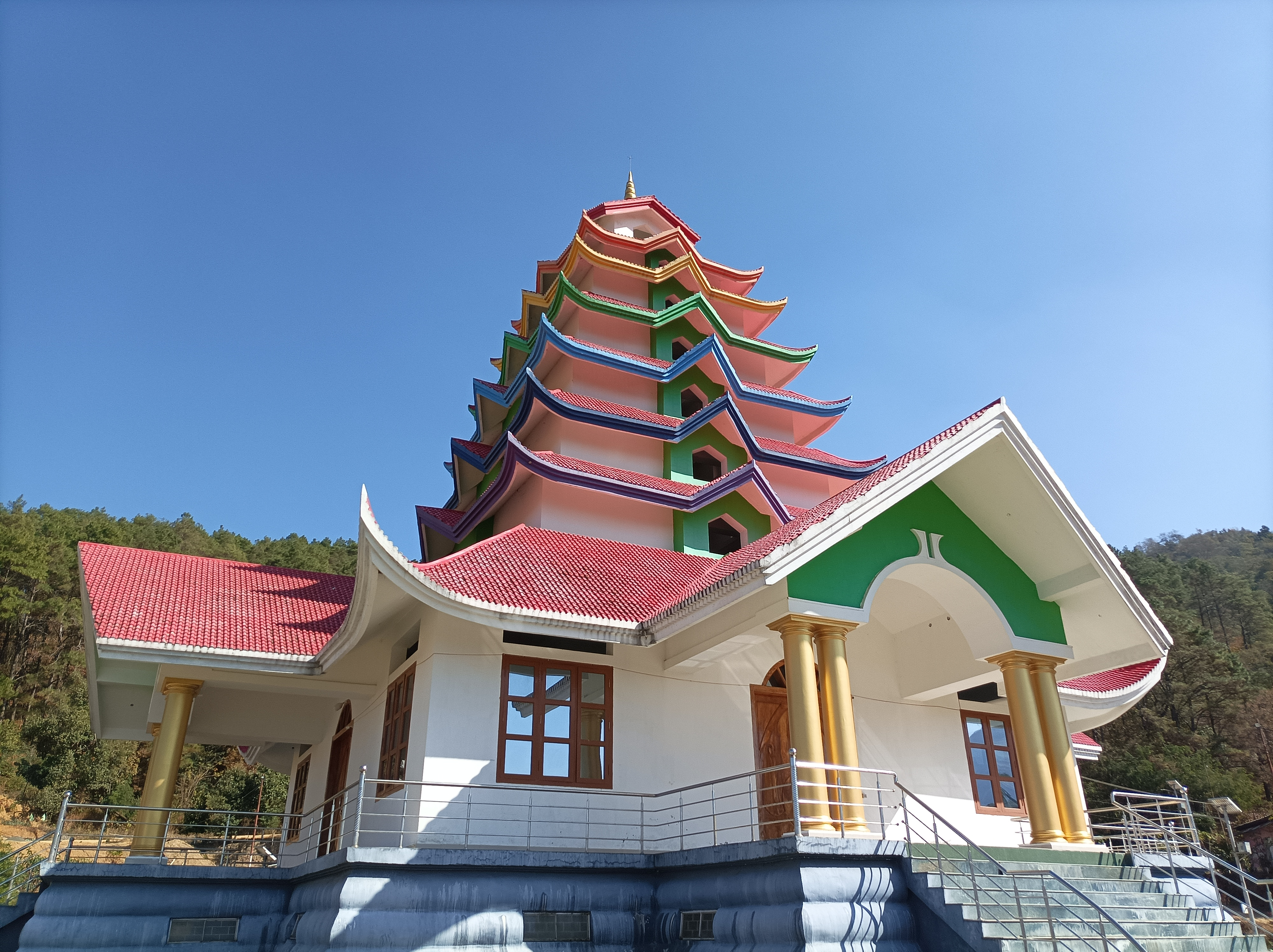
The Sanamahi Kiyong shrine is the central body of the University of Sanamahi Culture in the Nongmaiching Ching mountain.

== Autonomous institutions ==
- National Institute of Electronics and Information Technology (NIELIT), Imphal
- Indian Institute of Information Technology, Manipur
- National Institute of Technology, Manipur

== Medical colleges ==
- Jawaharlal Nehru Institute of Medical Sciences
- Regional Institute of Medical Sciences, Lamphelpat
- Shija Academy of Health Sciences
- Churachandpur Medical College

== Technical institutes ==
- Manipur Institute of Technology
- Manipur Technical University

== Universities ==
=== Central ===
- Central Agricultural University
- Manipur University
- National Sports University
- National Forensic Sciences University
- Indira Gandhi National Tribal University Regional Campus Manipur

=== Private ===
- Bir Tikendrajit University
- Manipur International University
- Sangai International University
- Asian International University

=== State ===
- Dhanamanjuri University
- Manipur Technical University
- Manipur University of Culture
