= Don Bosco College, Maram =

College in Manipur

Coordinates: 25.407°N 94.096°E

- Type: Autonomous college
- Established: 2000
- Affiliations: Manipur University
- Principal: Fr. (Dr.) K. O. Sebastian
- Location: Maram, Senapati, Manipur, 795015, India
- Campus: Rural
- Website: https://dbcmaram.ac.in/

Don Bosco College (DBC Maram) is an autonomous college established in 2000 in Maram, Senapati district, Manipur, India. Affiliated to Manipur University and operated by the Salesians of Don Bosco, it offers undergraduate and postgraduate courses in science, arts, and commerce.

== Overview ==
Don Bosco college was founded in 2000 under Fr. Jose Palely SDB, who later became Vice Chancellor of Assam Don Bosco University, and was subsequently led by Fr. Benny James SDB before Fr. K.O. Sebastian assumed the principalship in 2013. It is located approximately 85 kilometres north of Imphal in Senapati district, an area that had few residents prior to the college's establishment. In March 2021, the University Grants Commission (UGC) conferred autonomous status on the college, with Education Minister S. Rajen Singh citing it as the only institution in Manipur to have scored 3.5 NAAC credit points.

In 2014, Zeliangrong tribal organisations threatened a national highway blockade after a student was assaulted on campus, setting a 48-hour deadline for police to make arrests. A decade later, a similar blockade occurred demanding the arrest of a man accused of assaulting a student near the college premises. The Spear Corps has been know to tour the school for recruits.

== Academics ==
Along with its main departments, vocational education is also provided in areas such as carpentry, beauty, and other soft skills development. The college maintains a minimum attendance requirement of 80 percent..

The NAAC has given Don Bosco a CGPA of 3.35, at the time the highest in Manipur and second in northeast India, and the UGC subsequently designated it a "College with Potential for Excellence". The student body includes up to 69 tribes from Northeast India.

DBC has hosted international academic conferences, field-based community programmes, and job fairs.

Over its first 25 years the institution also received the Prime Minister's Award for participation in the Swachh Bharat Mission as well as three state-level Excellence Awards.

== Departments ==
=== Science ===
- Physics
- Chemistry
- Mathematics
- Computer Science
- Biotechnology
- Botany
- Zoology

=== Arts and Commerce ===
- English
- History
- Political Science
- Economics
- Education
- Sociology
- Social Work
- Commerce

=== Postgraduate ===
- Master of Sociology
- Master of English
- Master of Political Science

== See also ==
- Education in India
- Manipur University
- List of institutions of higher education in Manipur
