= Nekkhomang Neihsial =

Former Member (admin) Central Administrative Tribunal, Guwahati Benc]
- Preceded by: S.K Kohli

Personal details
- Born: Nekkhomang Neihsial; 1 March 1957 (age 69) Manipur, India
- Education: Churachandpur College, Manipur University

Nekkhomang Neihsial, born 1 March 1957, was a senior Bureaucrat of Indian Civil Services. Neihsial was appointed as the 47th Controller General of Defence Accounts CGDA, Ministry of Defence, of the Republic of India. He was from 1981 the batch IDAS (Indian Defence Accounts Department) cadre. He served as Addl CGDA before his promotion to CGDA. He was earlier working as Chief Internal Auditor, Ordnance Factories, Kolkata and Principal controller (Northern Command) Jammu and Principal Financial Advisor to Indian Navy. He was appointed as administrative member of the Central Administrative Tribunal in 2018. He is former administrative member of the Central Administrative Tribunal Bench in Guwahati, Assam.

== See also ==
- Indian Defence Accounts Service

Preceded by Sunil Kumar Kohli	CGDA	Succeeded by Smt. Veena Prasad
