= Beoncy Laishram =

North East Indian trans woman doctor

- Born: Kakwa Leiphrakpam Leikai, Imphal West, Manipur, India
- Other name: Diviya Laishram
- Education: MBBS
- Alma mater: Regional Institute of Medical Sciences (RIMS), Imphal
- Occupation: Doctor
- Employer: Government of Manipur
- Organization(s): Shija Hospitals and Research Center
- Known for: Being the first openly transgender doctor from Northeast India

Beoncy Laishram (born 1992/1993) is the first openly transgender doctor from Northeast India, and, as of 2021, she is the only transgender doctor from Manipur state. Beoncy is a Resident Medical Officer (RMO) at the Shija Hospitals and Research Institute in Imphal.

== Early life and education ==
Beoncy Laishram is the youngest of the three siblings. Her father was a bus driver.

Laishram finished her MBBS in the Regional Institute of Medical Sciences (RIMS) in 2011.

== Career ==
After working for some time in the Babu Jagjivanram Memorial Hospital in New Delhi, she worked in the North Eastern Indira Gandhi Regional Institute of Health and Medical Sciences (NEIGRIHMS) in Shillong as a junior resident doctor for one year. In November 2019 she joined at the Shija Hospital and Research Center in Imphal as a Resident Medical Officer (RMO), where she was involved in treating patients during the COVID-19 pandemic.

As of 2020 she is taking a post-graduate program in plastic surgery.

== Personal life ==
When Laishram was in Class 8 at Human Resource Development (HRD) School in Imphal, she began to understand that she was trans and not cisgender. She did not tell anyone she had a female gender identity until she was in her third year of MBBS. She came out to her family in 2013, but did not come out publicly due to her family's upset and her father's attempted suicide over the news. In the same year, she changed her name to Beoncy after participating in the beauty contest "Miss Trans Queen North East" in 2013.

In 2020 Laishram said:

"Friends were abusive, they taunted at me wherever I went. I withdrew into my closet to avoid the mental torture. It was a continuous struggle to establish my identity and make people accept it."

Around 2016, she began identifying as a transgender woman (Meitei: Nupi Maanbi). She had gender-affirming surgery in Puducherry. As of 2020 she had reconciled with her parents.

== See also ==
- Bishesh Huirem
- Robert Naorem
- Santa Khurai
