= Manipur University =

Public central university in Manipur, India

- ꯃꯅꯤꯄꯨꯔ ꯇꯥꯏꯕꯪ ꯃꯍꯩꯀꯣꯜ
- Motto: Dhiyo Yo Naḥ Prachodayāt
- Motto in English: May He Inspire Our Intellect
- Type: Public central university
- Established: 5 June 1980; 46 years ago
- Accreditation: NAAC B+ (2023)
- Affiliations: UGC, AIU
- Chancellor: T. Tirupati Rao
- Vice-Chancellor: Sumitra Phanjoubam (acting)
- Rector: Governor of Manipur
- Visitor: President of India
- Students: ≈7,396
- Location: Imphal, Manipur, India; 24°45′08″N 93°55′41″E
- Campus: Suburban, 287.53 acres (1.1636 km^{2})
- Language: English
- Website: www.manipuruniv.ac.in

Manipur University (Meitei: Manipur Taibang Maheikol) is a public central university in Imphal, the capital of the north-eastern Indian state of Manipur. Its main campus stands at Canchipur, on the southern fringe of the city, where it occupies the site of the Langthabal Konung, a former royal palace. The institution was set up by the Government of Manipur on 5 June 1980 under the Manipur University Act, 1980, and for the first quarter-century of its life it functioned as a state-run, teaching-cum-affiliating university with jurisdiction over Manipur as a whole. Central status came with the Manipur University Act, 2005, which the Parliament of India passed that year and which the President of India assented to on 28 December 2005; the new arrangement took effect from 13 October 2005.

The university today runs nine schools of studies and forty-seven academic departments, and it serves as the affiliating authority for 119 colleges across the state, of which three are medical colleges and one, the Manipur Institute of Technology, is its sole constituent college. It is recognised by the University Grants Commission and was re-accredited by the National Assessment and Accreditation Council (NAAC) with a 'B+' grade in its second cycle, completed in 2023.

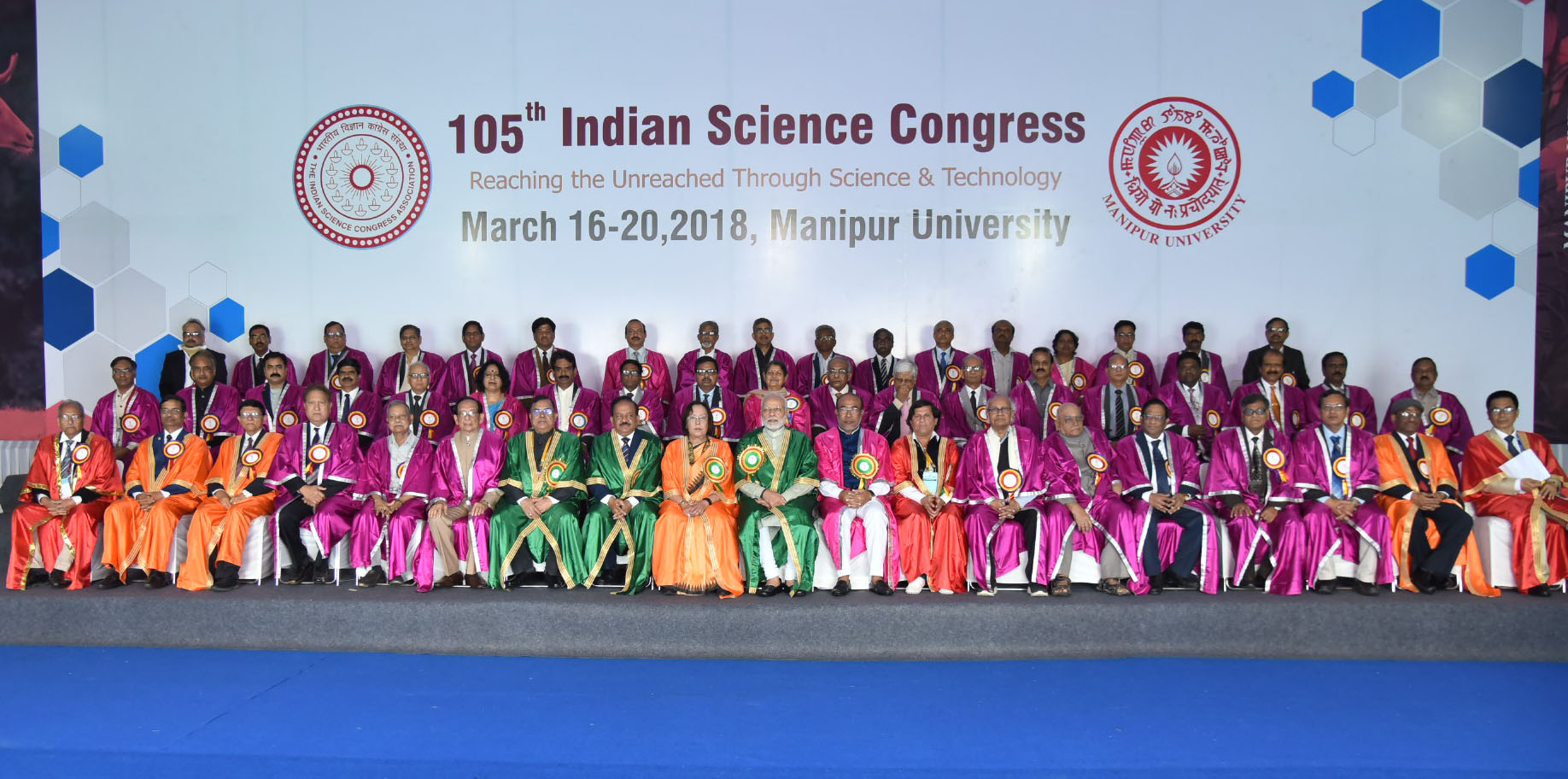
Prime Minister Narendra Modi inaugurating the 105th Indian Science Congress at Manipur University on 16 March 2018

== History ==
The story of higher education at Canchipur begins not in 1980 but in 1972, when Jawaharlal Nehru University opened a Post-Graduate Centre on the site. That centre was folded into the new Manipur University on 1 April 1981, and in the process the university inherited the buildings, faculty,and laboratories that would form the nucleus of its administrative headquarters and its early postgraduate teaching.

The first decade was modest. Seven postgraduate departments were set up in English, History, Mathematics, Economics, Political Science, Manipuri and Applied Biology, and the university spent much of the 1980s and 1990s extending that base while serving as the principal academic authority for general degree colleges across the state. The decisive turn came in 2005. The Manipur University Act of that year, enacted by the Parliament of India, converted the institution into a centrally administered university funded directly by the Ministry of Human Resource Development (now the Ministry of Education). The change took effect on 13 October 2005, three months before the President assented to the bill.

National attention followed in March 2018, when the campus hosted the 105th Indian Science Congress. Prime Minister Narendra Modi inaugurated the session on 16 March, joined on the dais by Najma Heptullah, the Governor of Manipur, the Union Minister for Science and Technology Harsh Vardhan, and Chief Minister N. Biren Singh. The session itself was something of an oddity: it had been scheduled for Osmania University in January, but the venue and dates were changed at short notice after Osmania's administration declined to host, citing the risk of campus agitations. Footfall reportedly fell from the customary 12,000 delegates to about 5,000, and it was only the second time in over a century that the Congress had met in north-east India.

== Campus ==
The university occupies the grounds of the Langthabal Konung, a palace established in October 1827 by Maharaja Gambhir Singh following the recovery of the Manipuri throne after the Burmese occupation. The Maharaja died on the same grounds, and the Manipuri poet Lamabam Kamal was born there. None of this is incidental on a campus that takes pride in its setting: the university sits about 7 kilometres (4.3 mi) south of central Imphal along the Indo-Myanmar Road (National Highway 39), and the Langthabal site has been retained as a historic precinct rather than rebuilt over.

In all, the campus extends over roughly 287.53 acres (1.1636 km^{2}) of suburban land. A substantial part of that area is given over to ponds, gardens and woodland, and a Biodiversity Park was inaugurated on the grounds in May 2025. Built infrastructure includes the central administrative block, departmental buildings for each school, a three-storey central library covering some 900 square metres of floor space, a health centre, an indoor stadium, five hostels (three for men, andtwo for women), staff quarters, a guest house, a State Bank of India branch and a post office. Three university buses connect the campus to greater Imphal; the Bir Tikendrajit International Airport at Tulihal is about 11 kilometres (6.8 mi) away.

== Organisation and administration ==
=== Governance ===
As with every central university in India, the Visitor is the President of India and the chief rector is the state Governor, in this case the Governor of Manipur. The Chancellor presides over the University Court but holds a largely ceremonial role; since 2024 the post has been held by Professor T. Tirupati Rao. Day-to-day administration runs through the Vice-Chancellor, a post left vacant for almost two years before Professor Naorem Lokendra Singh was appointed in July 2021 until 2026, in a single batch of central-university appointments that filled twelve such vacancies at once. A pro vice-chancellor, registrar, finance officer, controller of examinations and dean of students' welfare make up the rest of the senior team. Statutory bodies set up under the 2005 Act include the Court, the Executive Council, the Academic Council, the Finance Committee and the various Boards of Studies.

=== Schools and departments ===
Academic work is organised under nine schools: Education, Humanities, Human and Environmental Sciences, Life Sciences, Mathematical and Physical Sciences, Social Sciences, Medical Sciences, Engineering, and Management Studies. Between them they house forty-seven postgraduate departments. The disciplinary spread is broad. On the humanities and social-science side it covers Manipuri language and literature, English, history, political science, sociology, anthropology, fine arts and library science; on the science and engineering side it ranges through physics, mathematics, chemistry, life sciences, biotechnology, computer science, pharmacy and the various engineering streams housed at the Manipur Institute of Technology.

==== Department of Manipuri ====
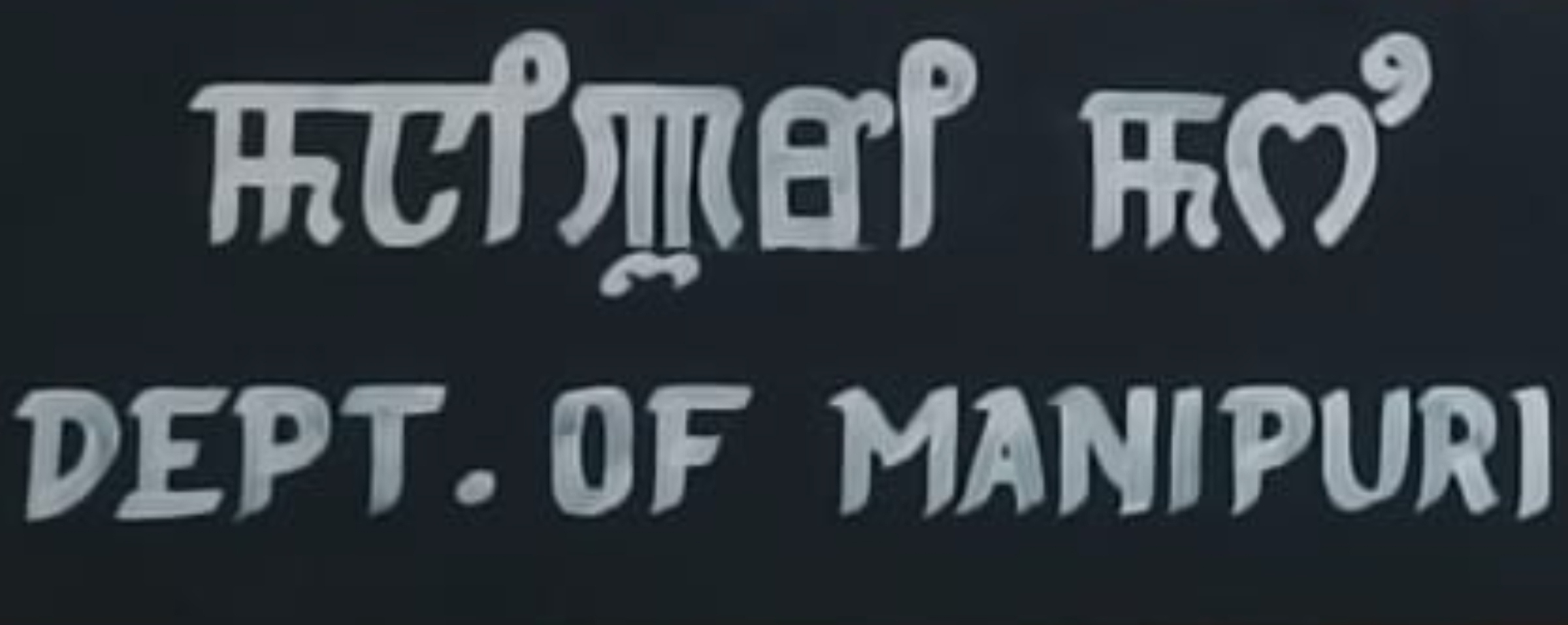
The Department of Manipuri at the Canchipur campus

Department of Manipuri (Meitei: Manipuri Masang), also known as Manipuri Department, is an educational department of studies in Meitei language (officially called Manipuri langlanguage)the university. It rganises research works in Meitei literature, specifically in Meitei folklore and in Old Manipuri (Ancient Meitei).

Key people are:

- Toijam Tampha Devi
- Nahakpam Aruna Devi
- Loitongbam Birjita Devi
- Wahengbam Kumari Chanu
- Chirom Rajketan Singh
- Koijam Shantibala Devi: an assistant professor of the department, was selected for the Sahitya Akademi Award 2022, for her poetry book Leironnung (Meitei: ꯂꯩꯔꯣꯟꯅꯨꯡ).
- Naorem Sanatomba Singh: an assistant professor of the Manipuri department of Manipur University, and Konthoujam Bimola, an associate professor of the Manipuri department of C.I. College, (Note: C.I. College (Chanambam Ibomcha College, Bishnupur) is a subsidiary institution as it is affiliated to the Manipur University.) were selected for the prestigious "Dr. Ambedkar Distinguished Service Award-2022", by the Bharatiya Dalit Sahitya Akademi (India), New Delhi.
- Rajen Toijamba: a retired professor of the department, was bestowed with the prestigious Sahitya Akademi Award 2017, for his play Chahi Taret Khuntakpa (Meitei for 'Seven Years' Devastation').
- P Gunindro Singh
- S Sanatombi Singha

The Department of Manipuri provides its students the courses for Manipuri language in the degrees of Master's Degree (MA) as well as Doctor of Philosophy (PhD). Departments of the same subject (Manipuri) of the colleges under the affiliation of the Manipur University offer courses in Bachelor's degree (B.A.). Department of Manipuri of the Manipur University has special Ph.D. programme and regular research programs for Manipuri folklore. The department allotted a paper of 100 marks on Folklore in the syllabus of master's degree of the Manipuri subject. The colleges affiliated to it also have similar papers, carrying 100 marks, dedicated to folklore, in the bachelor's degree. The allotment for same marks and the provision of similar paper for the study of folklore in Meitei are also done in Assam University. Both the departments of both the universities are training the students of Ph.D. for the specialisation in folklore, thereby uplifting the significance of Meitei folklore.

The Department of Manipuri annually celebrates the Malemgi Mamalolgi Numit (Meitei for 'International Mother Language Day') as well as the Meitei language day (formally known as Manipuri language day).

The Department of Manipuri encompasses various departments of the same subject (Manipuri) in colleges affiliated to the Manipur University, including but not limited to the "Department of Manipuri, Manipur College" (estd. 1958), the "Manipuri Department, Y. K. College", the "Manipuri Department, Oriental College", etc.

=== Centres of studies ===
Beyond the schools, seven specialised centres handle interdisciplinary teaching and research. The oldest and best known is the Centre for Manipur Studies, a UGC-sponsored area-studies centre that focuses on the history, culture and languages of the region; it has produced more than twenty-five published research works to date. The Centre for Myanmar Studies, an autonomous unit also funded by the UGC, runs six-month certificate courses in the Myanmarese language in two intakes a year, an obvious consequence of Manipur's location on the India–Myanmar border. Other centres include the Centre for Developmental Studies, which has from time to time offered intensive certificate and diploma courses in Japanese; an Educational Multimedia Research Centre; a Computer Centre that handles both administrative and student computing; and, most recently, a Centre for Indian Knowledge Systems, which the vice-chancellor inaugurated on 26 March 2026.

=== Affiliated and constituent colleges ===
For most college-going students in the state, the university's reach is felt less through its own departments than through its affiliating role. As of 2024, it has 119 affiliated colleges and a single constituent, the Manipur Institute of Technology, which sits within the School of Engineering. The university's own classification splits the affiliates into four broad groups: roughly forty-six government colleges, around seventeen government-aided ones, and a larger number of privately managed colleges holding either permanent or temporary affiliation.

Following is a list with some of affiliated colleges:

- Biramangol College
- Chanambam Ibomcha College, Bishnupur
- Churachandpur College
- Churachandpur Medical College
- Don Bosco College, Maram
- Hill College, Tadubi
- Ideal Girls' College, Imphal
- Imphal College
- Jawaharlal Nehru Institute of Medical Sciences, Imphal East
- Jiri College, Jiribam
- Kha-Manipur College
- Kamakhya Pemton College
- Liberal College, Imphal
- Lilong Haoreibi College
- The Maharaja Bodhachandra College, Imphal
- Manipur College
- Manipur Institute of Technology
- Mayai Lambi College
- Modern College, Imphal
- Moirang College
- Nongmeikapam Gopal College, Imphal
- Nambol L. Sanoi College
- Oriental College, Imphal
- Pettigrew College
- Presidency College, Motbung
- Rayburn College
- Regional Institute of Medical Sciences, Imphal West
- Shija Academy of Health Sciences
- Standard College, Kongba
- Tamenglong College
- Thoubal College
- United College, Lambung
- Yangambam Kumar College, Wangjing
- Moreh College

== Academics ==
=== Admissions ===
Entry to almost every programme runs through one of the central entrance examinations rather than through a university-administered test. Undergraduate admissions to BA, BSc and BVoc programmes are based on CUET-UG scores; postgraduate MA, MSc, MBA and MCA admissions on the CUET-PG; the BTech intake at the Manipur Institute of Technology on JEE Main through the Joint Seat Allocation Authority; and MTech admissions on GATE scores via the Centralised Counselling for M.Tech. The university also conducts its own Manipur University Entrance Test (MUET) for a portion of departmental seats, and where a candidate has sat both, the higher score is taken.

=== Programmes ===
The course catalogue runs to more than five hundred programmes, spanning certificate, diploma, undergraduate, postgraduate, M.Phil. and Ph.D. qualifications across the arts, commerce, sciences, engineering, education, management, law and vocational disciplines. A Four-Year Undergraduate Programme along the lines envisaged by the National Education Policy 2020 was rolled out from the 2025 academic session in arts, science and commerce, accompanied by revised regulations on the registration and evaluation of the dissertation that students must complete in their final year.

=== Library and student life ===
The Central Library is housed in a three-storey block of around 900 square metres. It holds over 161,000 books and subscribes to roughly 280 national and 43 foreign print journals, and it has run an online public access catalogue for years; the library was an early Indian adopter of the Information and Library Network (INFLIBNET), joining the consortium in 1993, and it provides electronic-journal access through UGC-INFONET. It also functions as a referral library for the state. Other facilities include language laboratories, a gymnasium, a cafeteria, a medical centre and a computer centre, alongside courts and grounds for football, basketball, badminton, volleyball, tennis, athletics, handball and table tennis.

== Rankings and accreditation ==
The National Institutional Ranking Framework (NIRF) of the Ministry of Education placed Manipur University in the 151–200 band in the overall category and the 101–150 band in the universities category in both 2023 and 2024. EduRank's 2025 country rating put it 172nd in India and 4,187th in the world on a composite of research output, alumni impact and non-academic reputation.

== Controversies and issues ==
=== 2018 administrative crisis ===
The single most damaging episode in the university's history began on 30 May 2018, when the Manipur University Students' Union (MUSU) walked off campus and called for the resignation of the vice-chancellor, Adya Prasad Pandey, who had been appointed on 24 October 2016 and had taken charge that December. The Manipur University Teachers' Association (MUTA) and the Manipur University Staff Association (MUSA) joined the agitation soon afterwards. The unions presented a memorandum of fifteen specific charges against the VC, the most prominent being prolonged unexplained absences from campus, alleged financial irregularities, a failure to fill statutory posts, and what protesters described as a creeping "saffronisation" of the institution.

A negotiated settlement on 16 August, signed by the unions, the Ministry of Human Resource Development and the state government, sent Pandey on leave pending an inquiry. The peace was short-lived. On 1 September the VC announced that he was resuming his duties and on the same day issued an order banning both MUTA and MUSA, claiming that the Manipur University Act, 2005 made no provision for employee bodies and accusing them of "subversive activities".

What followed in the early hours of 21 September drew international attention to the campus. Manipur Police commandos entered the five hostels just after midnight, took roughly ninety students and six staff (including five professors) into custody, and used tear gas inside the residences; eyewitnesses described the scene as resembling a "war zone" and at least ten students were injured. The Scholars at Risk network, an international academic-freedom monitor, formally listed the raid in its global registry of attacks on academic communities. Pandey was placed under suspension by an order of the Ministry of Human Resource Development dated 17 September 2018, issued in the name of the President of India in his capacity as Visitor and grounded in Statute 13(1) of the Manipur University Act, 2005 read with Section 16 of the General Clauses Act, 1897.

=== Disruption from the 2023–2025 ethnic violence ===
The outbreak of Meitei–Kuki ethnic violence in May 2023 hit the entire state's higher-education sector hard, and the university was no exception. By late 2024 official figures put the death toll at 258 and the number displaced at around 60,000, with the Imphal Valley and the surrounding hills effectively partitioned along armed checkpoints and buffer zones; an ACLED tracker covering 2023–2025 documents repeated flare-ups of inter-ethnic clashes, militant activity and resource disputes throughout the period. Examination schedules were postponed more than once. Repeated internet shutdowns disrupted online teaching for weeks at a stretch. Kuki-Zo students from the surrounding hill districts could not safely return to the Imphal Valley campus, and Meitei students from affiliated colleges in Churachandpur and other tribal-majority areas faced the reverse difficulty. A 2025 study in Strategic Analysis framed the educational fallout as part of a broader breakdown of civilian institutions in the state. President's Rule was imposed in February 2025 after the resignation of Chief Minister N. Biren Singh and was lifted only on 4 February 2026, when Yumnam Khemchand Singh was sworn in as Chief Minister.

== Notable people ==
=== Alumni ===
The Manipur University Alumni Association, formally constituted on 11 November 2004, draws together graduates working across politics, the civil services, sport, performing arts and academia.

In politics, the most senior alumnus in office is Thokchom Satyabrata Singh, the Bharatiya Janata Party legislator from Yaiskul constituency in Imphal East and, since March 2022, Speaker of the Manipur Legislative Assembly; he was elected unopposed to the post in the twelfth Assembly after serving as a state cabinet minister with portfolios for Consumer Affairs, Food and Public Distribution, Law and Legislative Affairs, and Labour and Employment.

In the civil services, Nekkhomang Neihsial, an officer of the 1981 batch of the Indian Defence Accounts Service, rose to become the 47th Controller General of Defence Accounts of the Government of India before retiring in February 2017; in 2018 he was appointed an administrative member of the Central Administrative Tribunal, where he has served on the Guwahati Bench, and he is also chairman of the civil-society body Vision Lamka in Churachandpur.

=== Faculty ===
The serving faculty includes Professor Yengkhom Raghumani Singh of the Department of Earth Sciences, who has been selected as adjunct faculty in the Department of Geology and Environmental Science at the University of Pittsburgh, and Dr Naorem Santa Singh, a Project Scientist in the Department of Life Sciences (Zoology), who received the ZSK-INDIA Research Excellence Award for Outstanding Contribution from the Zoological Survey of India in October 2023. Long-running departmental scholarship has been most concentrated in Manipuri language and literature, history and political science, where research on the language, history and politics of Manipur and the wider north-east has produced a substantial body of work; many of the senior staff hold doctorates from Banaras Hindu University, Jawaharlal Nehru University and Jamia Millia Islamia.

== See also ==
- List of universities in India
- List of central universities in India
- Education in Manipur
- Manipur Institute of Technology
- Department of Manipuri, Manipur University
