= Regional Institute of Medical Sciences, Imphal =

Medical College and Hospital in Imphal, India

- Motto: In the Service of Humanity
- Type: Medical college and Hospital
- Established: 14 September 1972; 54 years ago
- Affiliations: Manipur University; NMC
- Endowment: ₹693.24 crore (US$72 million)(2026–27 est.)
- Director: Dr. G. Sunil Kumar Sharma
- Academic staff: 186 (2024)
- Students: 753 (2024)
- Undergraduates: 600 (2024)
- Postgraduates: 137 (2024)
- Doctoral students: 16 (2024)
- Location: Imphal, Manipur, India; 24°48′56″N 93°55′02″E
- Campus: Urban, 192 acres (78 ha)
- Language: English
- Website: www.rims.edu.in

The Regional Institute of Medical Sciences, Imphal (RIMS, Imphal) was established on 14 September 1972 as the Regional Medical College. It is situated at Lamphelpat, suburb of Imphal city, in Manipur, India. It is run by a society named "North Eastern Regional Medical College Society" which was duly registered under the Manipur Societies Registration Act, 1989.

The institute is a 1,074 bed teaching hospital, having an intake capacity of 125 undergraduate, 146 Postgraduate Degree and 2 Postgraduate Diploma seats. The hospital normally provides services to more than 2.4 lakh out-door patients and admits over 31 thousand patients in a year. It has MEDLINE access from WHO, Tele-medicine Centre, Regional Medical Library, Advanced Hospital Information and Management System etc. The institute is affiliated to the Manipur University, Imphal and fulfills the prescribed norms of the National Medical Commission (NMC).

The campus of the institute occupies 192 acres (0.78 km^{2}) of land.

== History ==
A 300-bed General Hospital was inaugurated by Shri Y.B. Chavan, the then Union Home Minister on 22 October 1968. It is still being used as the main hospital block. On 22 May 1972, the foundation stone of the first ever medical college in Manipur, named Manipur Medical College, was laid by Shri B.K. Nehru, the then Governor of Manipur alongside Mohammed Alimuddin, the then Chief Minister of the state.

The medical college was established as a joint venture of the North Eastern States. On 14 September 1972, the name of the college was changed to Regional Medical College, Imphal. The college was later renamed as North Eastern Regional Medical College under the management of North Eastern Regional Medical College Society. From August 1976, it was run under the Ministry of Home, Government of India and was the only medical college run by the Ministry of Home. Nearly 19 years later, the college was again renamed as Regional Institute of Medical Sciences and its management was taken over by NEC, Ministry of DoNER, Government of India from 1 April 1995. After exactly 12 years, on the historic day of 1 April 2007, the institute was transferred to the Ministry of Health and Family Welfare, Government of India.

It is an institution of regional importance catering to the needs of the North Eastern Region in the field of medical education by providing undergraduate and post graduate courses, bringing together in one place the educational facilities for the training of personnel in all important branches of medical specialties. RIMS is a 1074 bedded teaching hospital, equipped with modern state of the art equipment and teaching facilities having an intake capacity of 100 undergraduate, 145 Postgraduate Degree and 6 Postgraduate Diploma seats. The Hospital normally provides services to more than 2.4 lakh out-door patients and admits over 31 thousand patients in a year. It has MEDLINE access from WHO, Tele-medicine Centre, Regional Medical Library, Advanced Hospital Information and Management System etc. The institute is affiliated to Manipur University, Imphal and fulfills the prescribed norms of the National Medical Commission.

== Administration ==
The institute is managed at two levels – (i). by the Executive Council chaired by the Secretary, North Eastern Council (NEC) in which the Health commissioner of the seven beneficiary states, Director General of Health, Govt. of India, the Joint Secretary, MDoNER and Vice-Chancellor, Manipur University are the members, and (ii). the Board of Governors chaired by the Hon'ble Chief Minister of Manipur in which Health Ministers of the seven beneficiary states, DGH, Joint Secretary, MDoNER and Vice-Chancellor of Manipur University are the members. For both the management bodies, Director, RIMS is the Member Secretary. The institute is fully funded by the Government of India through the North Eastern Council effective from 01 to 04-2002.

Initially the institute was under the administrative control of the Government of Manipur. Consequent upon formation of a society and registered under the Society's Regulation Act. 1860 (Central Act XXI of 1860) to grant autonomy on the initiative of the North Eastern Council, the management was taken over by the Society from 1 August 1976 with the Chief Minister of Manipur as the Chairman and the Head of the Institute as Secretary.

== Funding pattern ==
The institute is managed with the financial support from the constituent states and the Ministry of Home Affairs, Govt. of India, through North Eastern Council. The sharing pattern from the year 1995–96 to 2001-02 was as follows:

- Non recurring expenses - 100% by NEC both for College & Hospital.
- Recurring expenses
  - College NEC (50%) - Beneficiary States 50% as per seat allotted.
  - Hospital NEC (50%) - 25% by the Govt. of Manipur + 25% by other five constituent states on equal basis.

With the implementation of the 10th Five Years Plan, the present funding pattern is 100% for both recurring and non recurring expenses by the North Eastern Council, Shillong.

== Hospital ==
The RIMS Hospital has 1074 bed strength. The erstwhile General Hospital of the Govt. of Manipur was attached for teaching purpose with bed strength of 250.

General Ward	929
Paying Ward	75
Intensive Care Unit	34
Intensive Care Unit (ICU, ICCU, NICCU, PICU, Dialysis)	34
Complementary Beds (Casualty, PPP)	36
Total Bed Strength	1074

Round the year, Doctors are attending number of OPD patients and numbers of patients are admitted in the hospital. There had been better nursing care with the induction of more staff nurses. It has 18 clinical departments, Casualty and emergency ward and a blood bank. Number of voluntary donors are donating blood and the blood bank continues to provide blood whenever needed. It has a stand-by Diesel Generator of 250 KVA capacity also.

=== Departments ===
1. Anaesthesiology
2. Anatomy
3. Biochemistry
4. Biostatistics
5. Immunohematology and Blood Transfusion Department
6. Cardiovascular & Thoracic surgery
7. Clinical Psychology
8. Community Medicine
9. Dentistry
10. Dermatology, STD & Leprosy
11. Emergency Services
12. Forensic Medicine
13. Gastroenterology
14. Cardiology
15. Endocrinology unit, dept of Medicine
16. Surgical Gastroenterology & Minimal Access Surgery Unit, Department of Surgery
17. Medicine
18. Microbiology
19. Nephrology
20. Obstetrics & Gynaecology
21. Otorhinolaryngology Head and Neck Surgery
22. Ophthalmology
23. Orthopaedics
24. Pediatrics
25. Pathology
26. Pharmacology
27. Physical Medicine and Rehabilitation
28. Physiology
29. Plastic Surgery
30. Psychiatry
31. Radiodiagnosis
32. Radiotherapy
33. General Surgery
34. Tuberculosis & Respiratory Diseases (Chest Medicine)
35. Telemedicine Unit
36. Urology
37. Oncosurgery u/c department of surgery
38. Neurosurgery
39. Pediatric surgery

=== Emergency ===
All emergency cases are managed by dedicated emergency medical officers, dedicated speciality department residents and when needed, further referred to super-speciality department residents on call. Blood bank, emergency laboratory & radiological investigations and operation theatre services are run day and night.

== Education ==
Undergraduate (MBBS), BDS, postgraduate diplomas and degrees - (M.S., M.D.), D.M. (Nephrology), M.Ch. ( Urology, Plastic Surgery) courses are conducted at RIMS. MPhil and PhD programmes are also offered.

=== Postgraduate and postdoctoral degrees ===
Intake capacity: 145 per annum Postgraduate Course in Immunohematology and Transfusion Medicine & postdoctoral course D.M. in Nephrology have been recently started, in addition to the other conventional specialities. M.Ch. courses in Urology and Plastic Surgery are well established.

=== PG Diploma ===
Intake capacity: 2 per annum

- Diploma in Clinical Pathology

=== Nursing ===
Nursing College started functioning from December 2009. It has an annual intake of 50 students for the B.Sc Nursing Degree awarded by the Manipur University

=== Dental College ===
Dental college begun functioning from 2012. It has an annual intake of 50 students for Bachelor of Dental Surgery (BDS) Degree awarded by the Manipur University.

=== Publications ===
1. Journal of Medical Society(Indexed in Excerpta Medica of Elsevier) - Three times a year http://medicalsociety.rims.edu.in/
2. REMEDY - Annual
3. RIMS NEWSLETTER - Quarterly
4. Annual Report - Annual

== Facilities available ==
There is a Regional Medical library with the facilities of Internet and MEDLARS. There are 9 (nine) Lecture Halls, one indoor stadium with Gallery, an auditorium known as Jubilee Hall with 1000 capacity Balcony Seating, 3 canteens, 12 hostels ( PG Hostels, 6 MBBS students hostels), 249 staff Quarters and 1 Guest House. There is a branch of UBI and also Bank of Baroda [BOB] in the campus with an ATM Facility.

The Manipur State medico legal centre is at Forensic Medicine department, RIMS. It is also one of the 8 AIDS referral centers of India. A 6 (six) bodies cold storage is also in the Anatomy & Forensic Dept.

== Controversies ==
On 7 January 1995, several CRPF personnel were fired at by suspected members of an armed opposition group in a toilet complex attached to the RMC (RIMS) Hospital, Imphal. Together with other CRPF personnel who arrived on the scene, twelve CRPF officials returned fire. A total of nine civilians were killed including an MBBS student from Arunachal Pradesh, Momi Riba.

On 17 March 2008 the Ad hoc Additional Sessions Judge, Fast Track Court, Guwahati has convicted four CRPF personnel for killing the nine civilians.

In another case, there was an issue about Former in-charge Director dishonouring Manipur High Court order. L. Ranjit Singh, who had previously served as the in-charge Director, continued to occupy the Director's office even after the Manipur High Court nullified his appointment on 19 December 2022. Despite the court order, Ranjit utilised the privileges associated with the Director's position, including access to facilities like vehicles and security escorts.

== Notable alumni ==
- Beoncy Laishram, first transgender doctor from Northeast India
