= Jawaharlal Nehru Institute of Medical Sciences =

Medical college and hospital in Porompat, Imphal East, Manipur, India

- Other names: JNIMS
- Former names: Jawaharlal Nehru Hospital
- Motto: "Towards a Healthy Manipur"
- Type: Medical Education; Research Institute
- Established: 1989; 37 years ago
- Affiliations: Manipur University, NMC
- Director: Dr. Longjam Usharani Devi
- Undergraduates: 400 per Annual Session
- Postgraduates: 145 (needs re-assessment)
- Location: Imphal, India; 24°48′41″N 93°57′41″E
- Campus: Urban, 100 acres (0.40 km^{2})
- Website: jnims.nic.in

The Jawaharlal Nehru Institute of Medical Sciences (JNIMS) is a premier state funded medical college and hospital located in Porompat, Imphal East, Manipur. It was established in 1989 as Jawaharlal Nehru Hospital, commonly referred to as JN Hospital. It has 21 departments, with the addition of a separate Dental College in 2017. As of May 2019, there have been 11 academic batches, nine of the MBBS course and two of the BDS course.

== Hospital Blocks ==
There are 4 hospital blocks which include a separate OPD Block, a Medicine block, the main block which houses various wards including the Casualty ward and Special ward. The Dental OPD is situated near the BDS Lecture Halls.

== Hostels ==
Boys: As of 2019, there are four separate hostels for MBBS undergrads and a co-ed hostel for BDS.

Girls: For enhanced security, girls of MBBS are housed in a single state-of-the-art hostel. BDS girls share a co-ed hostel with the boys.

Apart from these, PGs, Residents and Interns are given separate accommodation (a matter of choice in the later).

== Examinations ==
The MBBS system consists of nine semesters which includes four University Exams.
