= Manipur Institute of Technology =

College in Manipur

- Former names: Government College of Technology (1998–2003); Manipur College of Technology (2003–2005)
- Type: Public
- Established: August 28, 1998; 28 years ago
- Academic affiliations: Manipur University
- Principal: N. Basanta Singh
- Location: Imphal, Manipur, 795004, India; 24.7994°N 93.9050°E
- Website: mitimphal.in

The Manipur Institute of Technology (erstwhile Government College of Technology) was established on 28 August 1998 by the Government of Manipur as Pioneer Engineering College in the State. On 31 December 2003, the College was renamed as Manipur College of Technology and the management of the College was handed over to a Society headed by the Hon’ble Chief Minister of Manipur as Chairman. Further, the Institute was renamed as Manipur Institute of Technology (MIT) since 4 February 2005. MIT became a Constituent College of Manipur University w.e.f. 13 October 2005 and it is being maintained by the Manipur University out of the funds made available to it by the University Grants Commission.

== History ==
It came into existence on 28 August 1998 with three engineering disciplines viz. Computer Science & Engineering, Electronics & Communication Engineering and Civil Engineering for the promotion of higher technical education in the state. Classes of the 1st batch were started from 16 December 1998. The initial approved intake capacity as per AICTE is 150 (one hundred and fifty) students per year; however, the present approved by the State Govt. is 90 seats per year.

== Campus ==
The campus is located at Takyelpat at a distance of 4 km from the heart of Imphal, the capital city of Manipur in a comfortable surrounding with the NH-53 running south of it. At present it shares a common campus with Government Polytechnic, Imphal. ITI Imphal and Oriental College is just beside it. The campus is around 8 km. from the Imphal Airport. The nearest railway station is Dimapur in Nagaland(250 km. from Imphal).The institute has also a new campus inside Manipur University Campus, Canchipur.The University campus is spread over an area of 287 acres in the historic Canchipur which is the site of the old palace of Manipur "The Langthabal Konung (Palace)" which was established by Maharaja Ghambhir Singh in 1827 AD just after the liberation of Manipur from Burmese (Myanmar) occupation. Maharaja Gambhir Singh took his last breath at Canchipur. Canchipur is located along the National Highway (NH-2) at about 8 km. from the heart of the Imphal City and 12 km. from Imphal International Airport.

== Departments ==
=== Computer Science & Engineering ===
The department offers BE degree in Computer Science and Engineering. The course is of 4 years duration organized in 8 semesters. The current intake strength is 30 students. The department is currently shifted to Manipur University campus.

Laboratory Facilities:

- Computer Graphics Lab.
- DBMS Lab.
- Software Lab.
- Networking Lab.
- Programming Lab.

Electronics Lab

- Fibre Optics Lab
- Signal Processing Lab

=== Civil Engineering ===
It offers 4 years BE degree course in Civil Engineering. The current intake strength is 30 students.

Laboratory Facilities:

- Material Testing Lab.
- Fluid Mechanics Lab.
- Environmental Lab.
- Photogrammetry and Remote Sensing Lab.
- Soil Mechanics Lab.
- Structural And CAD lab.
- Transportation Engineering lab.
- Surveying Lab.
- Geology Lab.

== Library ==
There are around 20 thousands volumes covering all disciplines of science, engineering & technology, humanities & social sciences. In addition to the books, few collection of audio/video cassettes and CDROM discs also available in the Library. The library currently subscribes to around 15 national and international journals in sciences, engineering and humanities.

== Student life ==
The institute has a Hostel Block which can accommodate around 200 students.

Internet connectivity is provided to all the students through VSAT. There is a large football field, a basketball court and a cricket pitch (under construction). The establishment of various clubs like Debating club, Music Club, Photography club, Hiking Club and Hobby club etc. is on the way.

== Training and Placement ==
The Training and Placement Cell of the college looks after the placement of the students. It arranges training of students so that they come up with suitable jobs in the industry and various private and public sector organizations. The Training and Placement cell have started inviting senior executives of major industries and organizations to provide pre-placement courses to the students prior to formal campus interviews.
