= Imphal =

Capital city of the Indian state Manipur

- Capital city
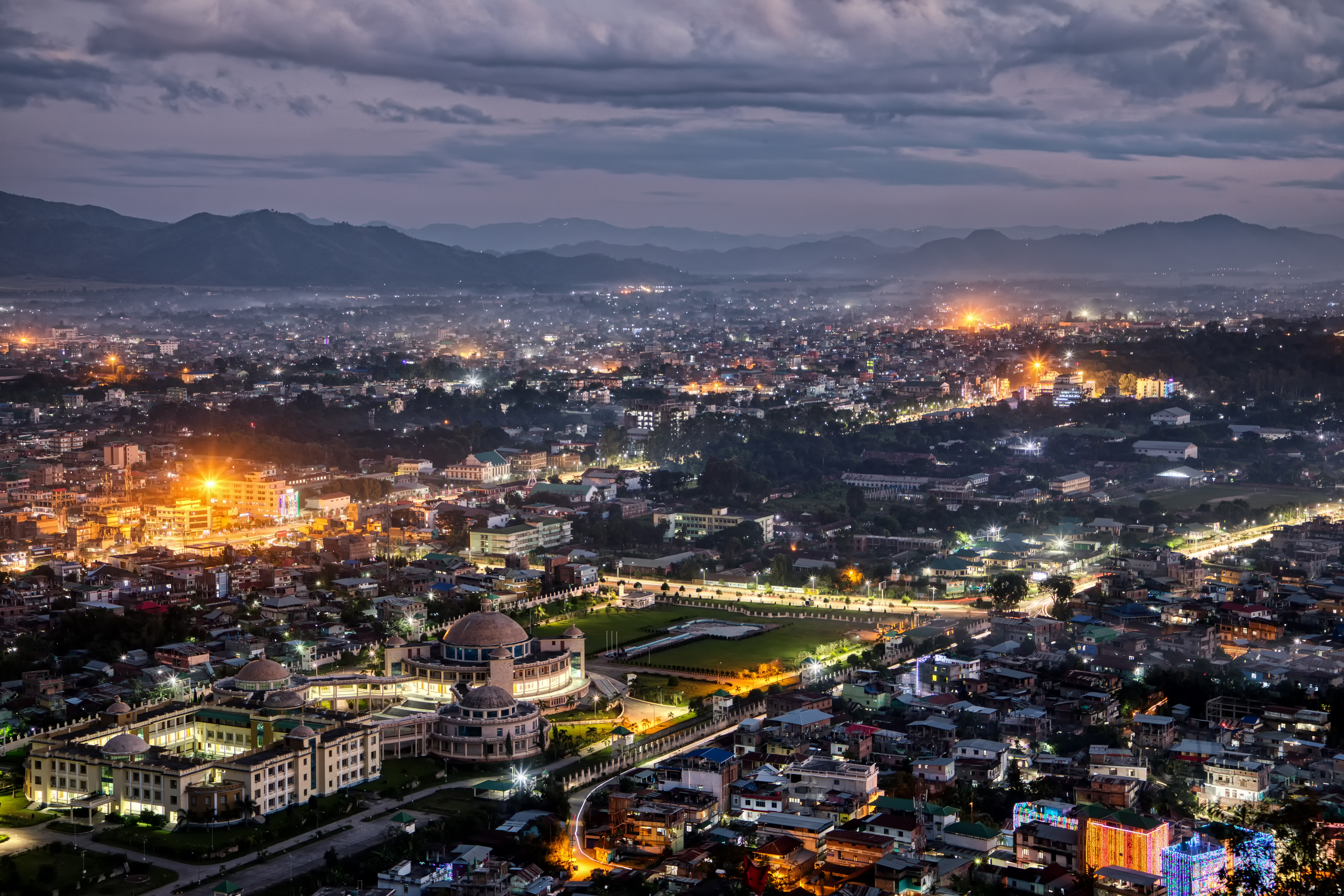
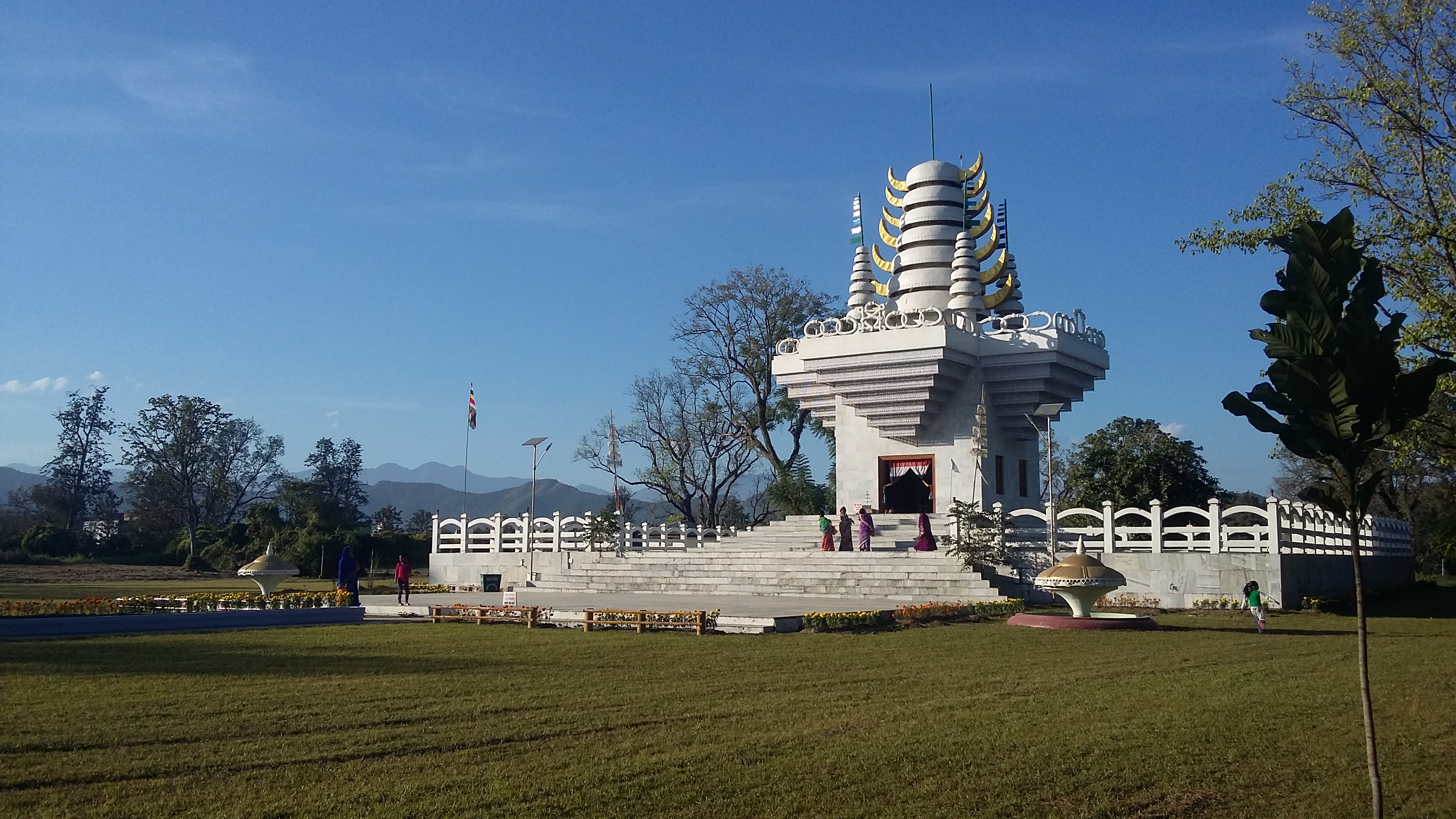
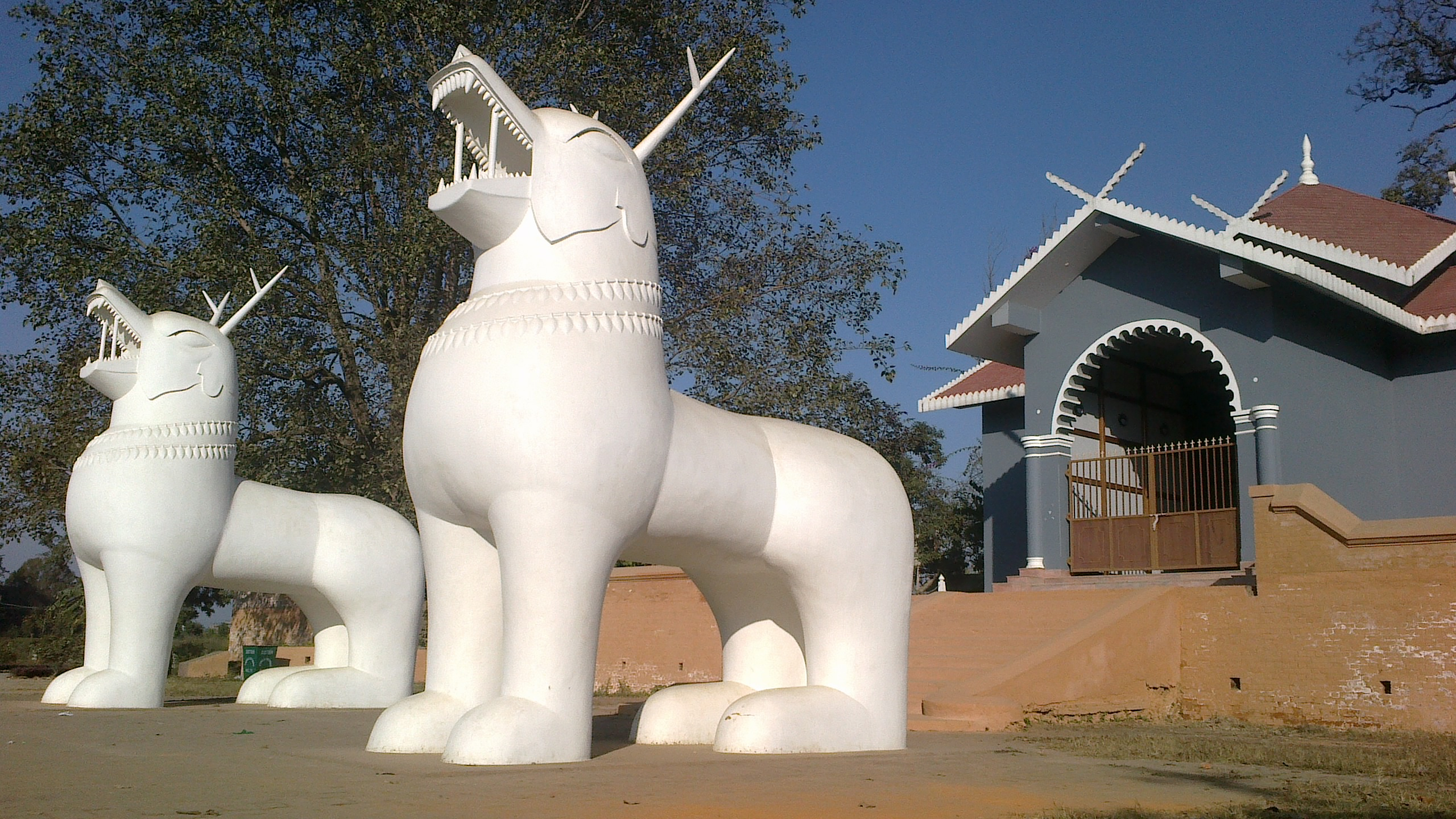
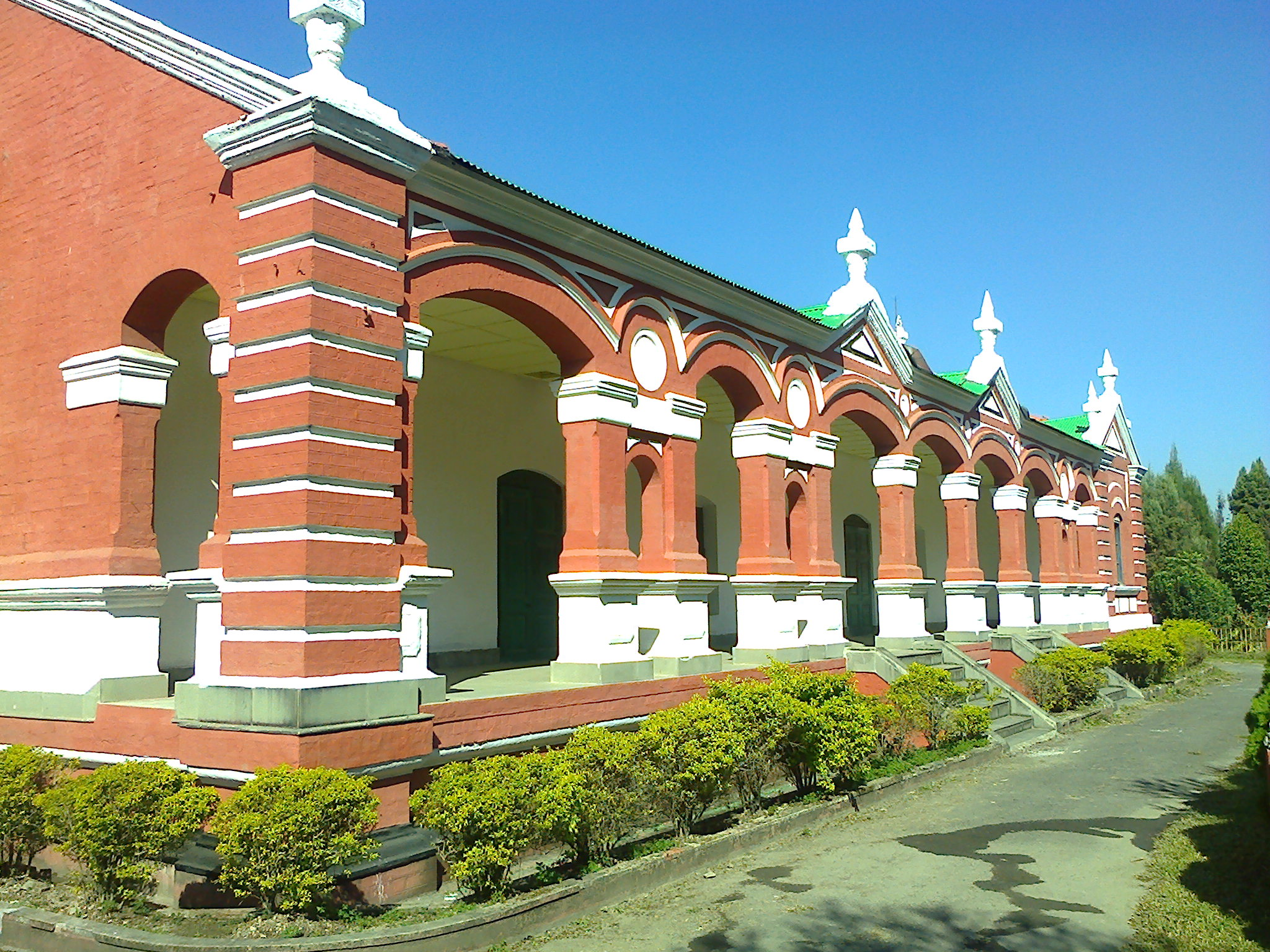
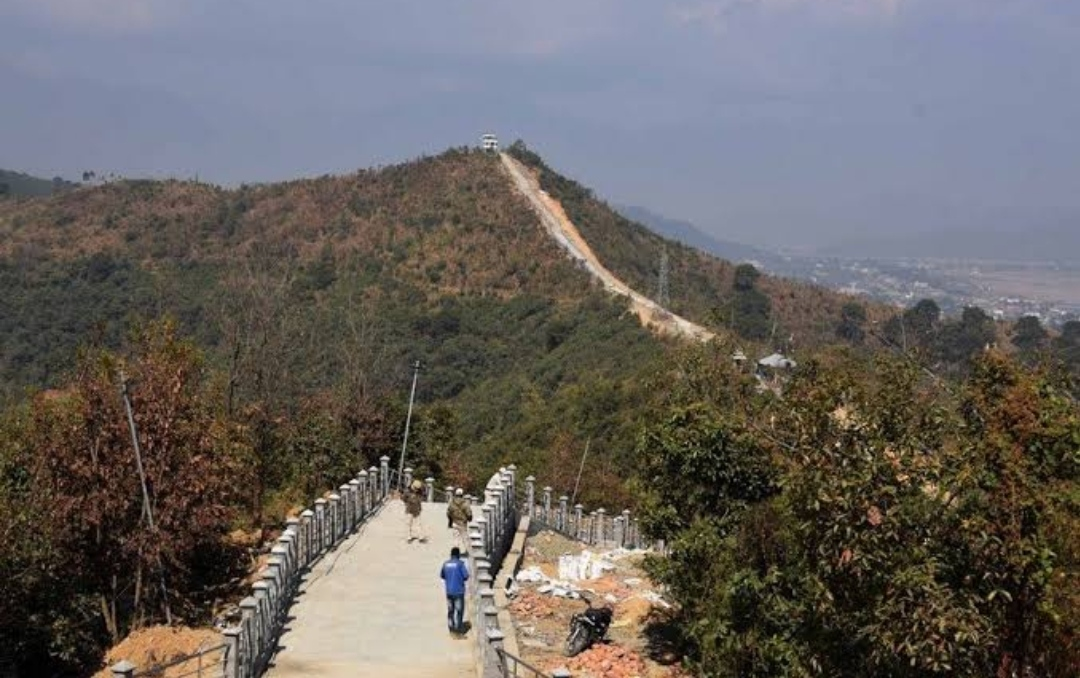
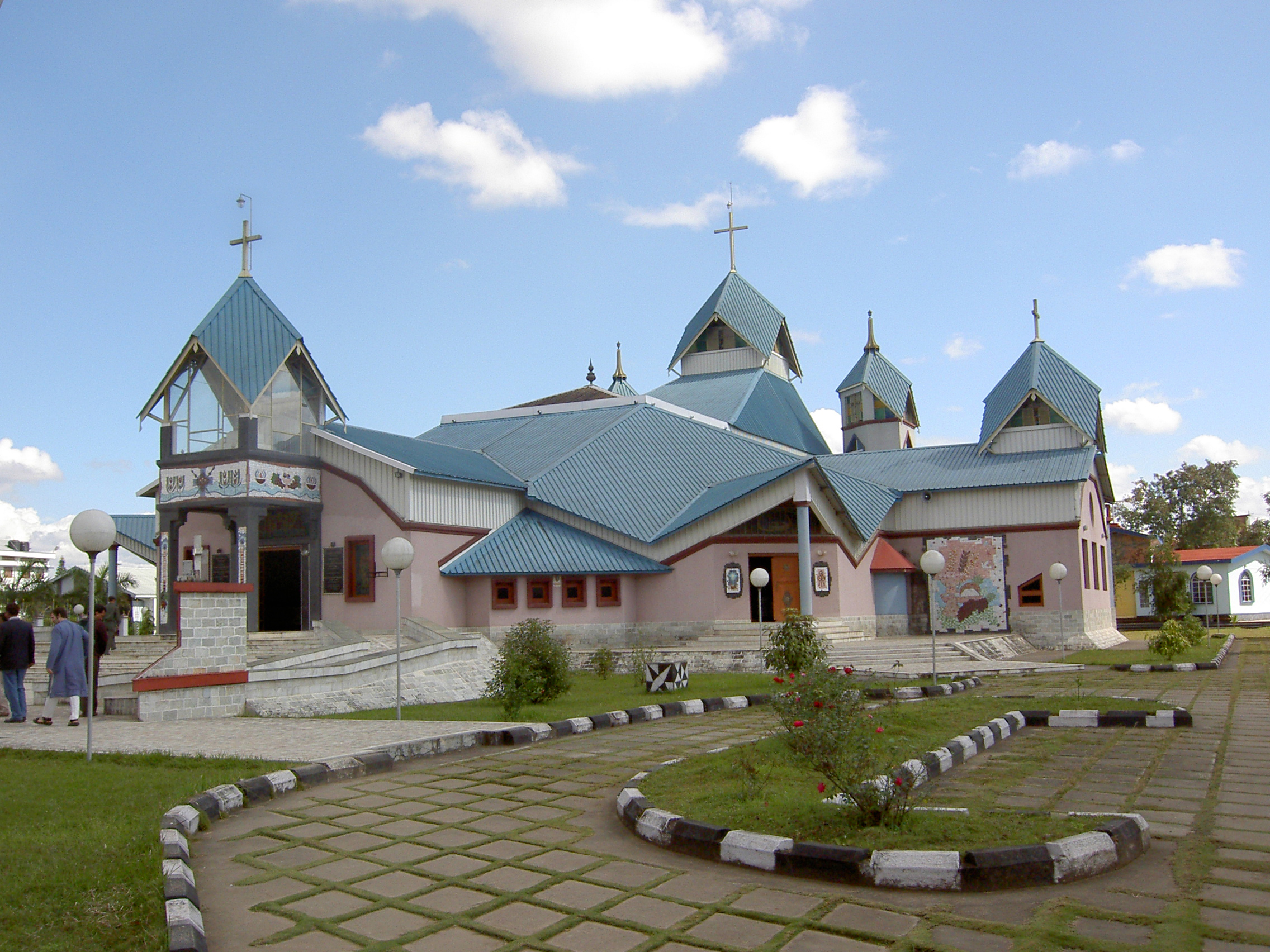
- Clockwise from top: Imphal city view, Nongshaba, Langol Hills, Shree Govindajee Temple, St. Joseph's Cathedral, Imphal, Kangla Fort Complex, Sanamahi Temple

- Location of Imphal in Manipur Imphal (India) Imphal (Asia) Imphal (Earth)
- Coordinates: 24.8074°N 93.9384°E
- Country: India
- State: Manipur
- District: Imphal East, Imphal West

Government
  - Type: Municipal Corporation
  - Body: Imphal Municipal Corporation
  - Mayor: Shri L. Lokeshwar Singh

Area
  - Metro: 94 km^{2} (36 sq mi)
  - Rank: 1
- Elevation: 786 m (2,579 ft)

Population (2024)
  - Capital city: 390,000
  - Rank: 1
  - Density: 4,150/km^{2} (10,700/sq mi)
  - Metro: 617,584

Language(s)
  - Official: Manipuri (Meitei); English
  - Regional: Imphal dialect
- Time zone: UTC+5:30 (IST)
- PIN: 795001
- Telephone code: 3852
- Vehicle registration: MN-01
- Website: imc.mn.gov.in

Imphal (UK: /ˈɪmfɑːl/ IM-fahl, US: /ˈɪmphʌl/ IMP-hul; Meitei: [impʰal]) is the capital city of the Indian state of Manipur. The metropolitan centre of the city contains the ruins of Kangla Palace (officially known as Kangla Fort), the royal seat of the former Kingdom of Manipur, surrounded by a moat. Spread over parts of the districts of Imphal West and Imphal East, the former contains the majority of the city's area and population. Imphal is part of the Smart Cities Mission under the Ministry of Housing and Urban Affairs. Being a prominent commercial hub, Imphal is known for its weaving, brass-ware, bronze-ware, and other cottage industries.

INS Imphal, the third ship of the Visakhapatnam-class stealth guided missile destroyer of the Indian Navy, was named in recognition of the Indian soldiers who fought in Battle of Imphal during World War II, and is the first Indian Navy Ship (INS) named after a city in Northeast India.

== Etymology ==
The name Imphal (Meitei: ꯏꯝꯐꯥꯜ) is derived from two words: ꯌꯨꯝ yum, meaning 'house', and ꯐꯥꯜ phāl, meaning 'plenty' or 'beautiful'. In old Manipuri language, yum was also spelt as im. Even today, Imphal is occasionally pronounced as Yum-phal.

== History ==
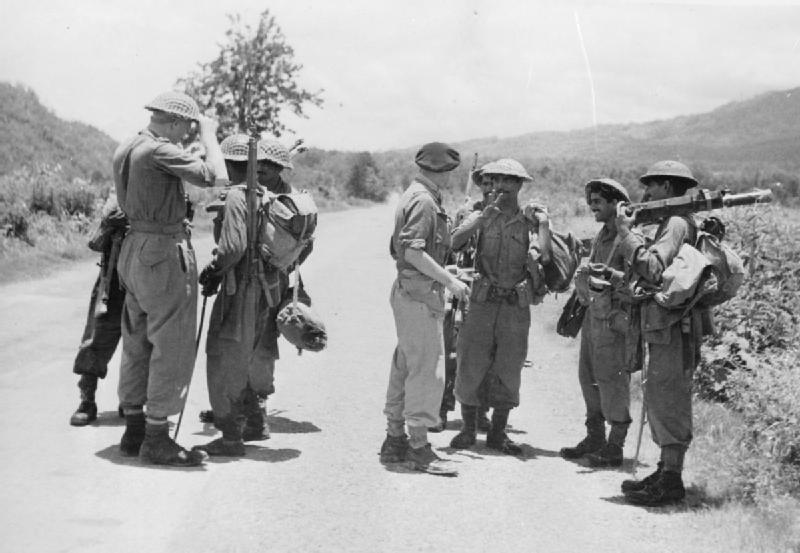
Soldiers of the two wings of the 14th Army link-up at Milestone 109 during the Battle of Imphal-Kohima

King Pakhangba established the Kangla Fort, once the capital of Manipur in 33CE.

Previously ruled by the kings of the Khaba clan, the Ningthouja dynasty started to rule the kingdom after the ascension of King Nongda Lairen Pakhangba. The Ningthouja clan quickly expanded and dominated the region in politics and war. Kangla Palace was built by King Khagemba and his son Khunjaoba. The palace was later destroyed by the British during the Anglo-Manipur War. During the reign of Maharaja Bhagyachandra, there were a number of Burmese invasions. However, the kingdom survived with the help of Maharaj Gambhir Singh.

Imphal remained peaceful until 1891, when there were internal differences in the royal family. The British sent J.W. Quinton to help, but the situation only grew worse and Senapati Tikendrajit (also the prince) was ordered to be arrested. The autocratic British behaviour made people angry. This resulted in the 1891 Anglo-Manipur War, which the British won. As a result, many Manipuri soldiers were killed, some including the king of that time period, Maharaja Kulachandra were sentenced to imprisonment and sent to the cellular jail in Andaman and Nicobar Islands, and leaders like Tikendrajit and Thangal General were also hanged.

The Battle of Imphal took place between March and July 1944, during World War II. The Japanese had invaded Imphal to destroy Allied forces and then invade India, but they were defeated and forced to retreat. The attack made the British realise the militarily strategic position of Imphal.

== Geography and climate ==
Imphal

Climate chart (precipitation, max. and min. temperature)
J	F	M	A	M	J	J	A	S	O	N	D
12 22 4	31 23 7	92 27 12	133 28 16	159 29 18	225 29 21	223 29 22	195 29 21	147 29 20	112 28 17	46 25 11	15 22 5
- █ Average max. and min. temperatures in °C
- █ Precipitation totals in mm
- Source: IMD
Imperial conversion
J	F	M	A	M	J	J	A	S	O	N	D
0.5 71 40	1.2 74 45	3.6 80 53	5.2 83 60	6.2 84 65	8.9 85 70	8.8 84 71	7.7 85 70	5.8 84 68	4.4 83 62	1.8 78 52	0.6 72 42
- █ Average max. and min. temperatures in °F
- █ Precipitation totals in inches

Imphal lies in the Imphal Valley surrounded by nine ranges of hills at 24.8074°N 93.9384°E in extreme eastern India, with an average elevation of 786 metres (2,579 ft).

It has a humid subtropical climate (Köppen: Cwa) with cool, dry winters and a slightly hot monsoon season. Imphal enjoys a moderate climate tempered by its moderately high altitude and the surrounding hills. Maximum temperatures in the hottest months average about 29 °C (84 °F); January is the coldest month, with average lows near 4 °C (39 °F), often drops to around 1 °C in the coldest nights and in some clear nights drops below freezing point. Frost is observable in the winter mornings few days of the year. The city receives about 1,381 mm (54.4 in) of rain, with June and July being the wettest months. Imphal observes 42.2 days with thunder and 46.1 days with fog, annually. Thunder is common in the pre monsoon and rainy season, whereas fog mostly occurs in the dry winter mornings which clears out in the noon.

The highest recorded temperature was 36.1 °C (97.0 °F), on 29 April 1999, and the lowest temperature was −2.7 °C (27.1 °F) on 10 January 1970.

Climate data for Imphal (1991–2020, extremes 1953–present)
Month	Jan	Feb	Mar	Apr	May	Jun	Jul	Aug	Sep	Oct	Nov	Dec	Year
Record high °C (°F)	29.1 (84.4)	32.0 (89.6)	35.0 (95.0)	36.1 (97.0)	35.6 (96.1)	35.9 (96.6)	35.7 (96.3)	35.2 (95.4)	34.6 (94.3)	34.2 (93.6)	31.4 (88.5)	28.9 (84.0)	36.1 (97.0)
Mean maximum °C (°F)	25.7 (78.3)	28.4 (83.1)	31.9 (89.4)	33.0 (91.4)	33.4 (92.1)	33.0 (91.4)	32.7 (90.9)	33.0 (91.4)	32.9 (91.2)	32.2 (90.0)	29.5 (85.1)	25.9 (78.6)	34.2 (93.6)
Mean daily maximum °C (°F)	22.9 (73.2)	25.0 (77.0)	27.9 (82.2)	29.0 (84.2)	29.3 (84.7)	29.9 (85.8)	29.7 (85.5)	30.0 (86.0)	30.0 (86.0)	29.1 (84.4)	26.4 (79.5)	23.2 (73.8)	27.7 (81.9)
Mean daily minimum °C (°F)	5.2 (41.4)	8.2 (46.8)	12.6 (54.7)	16.2 (61.2)	19.2 (66.6)	21.8 (71.2)	22.5 (72.5)	22.2 (72.0)	21.2 (70.2)	17.9 (64.2)	11.5 (52.7)	6.7 (44.1)	15.4 (59.8)
Mean minimum °C (°F)	1.6 (34.9)	3.8 (38.8)	7.6 (45.7)	12.1 (53.8)	15.4 (59.7)	19.3 (66.7)	20.9 (69.6)	20.6 (69.1)	18.8 (65.8)	13.3 (55.9)	6.4 (43.5)	2.8 (37.0)	1.7 (35.1)
Record low °C (°F)	−2.7 (27.1)	−1.4 (29.5)	2.4 (36.3)	6.2 (43.2)	11.1 (52.0)	14.7 (58.5)	14.7 (58.5)	14.6 (58.3)	14.3 (57.7)	7.8 (46.0)	1.5 (34.7)	−1.7 (28.9)	−2.7 (27.1)
Average rainfall mm (inches)	10.5 (0.41)	21.6 (0.85)	70.8 (2.79)	124.1 (4.89)	191.6 (7.54)	218.1 (8.59)	229.9 (9.05)	194.8 (7.67)	163.3 (6.43)	112.5 (4.43)	26.2 (1.03)	17.7 (0.70)	1,381 (54.37)
Average rainy days (≥ 2.5 mm)	1.0	2.7	5.0	9.2	12.4	14.7	16.1	13.0	9.7	7.2	1.8	0.9	93.8
Average relative humidity (%) (at 17:30 IST)	61	54	52	62	70	77	80	80	80	79	74	71	70
Source: India Meteorological Department

== Demographics ==
Religion in Imphal
1. Hinduism (69.7%)
2. Sanamahism (14.4%)
3. Christianity (10.3%)
4. Islam (3.59%)
5. Buddhism (0.54%)
6. Jainism (0.45%)

At the time of the 2011 census, Imphal Municipal Council had a population of 277,196, of which 135,059 were males and 142,137 females. Imphal had a sex ratio of 1052 females per 1000 males and a literacy rate of 90.8%: 95.1% for males and 86.77% for females. 29,216 (10.54%) were under 6 years of age, 14,997 being males and 14,219 females. Scheduled Castes and Scheduled Tribes made up 1,274 (0.46%) and 29,778 (10.74%) of the population respectively.

Hinduism is the majority religion in Imphal. Sanamahism followers are the second-largest group, and Imphal in particular contains a famous Pakhangba temple in Kangla Fort. Christianity is the third-largest religion, practised mainly by the hill tribes in Imphal. Islam is a minority religion practised by the Pangals, while Buddhism is practised by the Gorkhas, while Sikhism and Jainism by migrants from the mainland.

At the time of the 2011 census, 82.80% of the population spoke Manipuri, 3.65% Kabui, 2.20% Hindi, 1.39% Thadou, 1.31% Tangkhul, 1.18% Nepali, 1.11% Bengali, 1.10% Bhojpuri and 1.00% Kuki as their first language.

== Government and politics ==
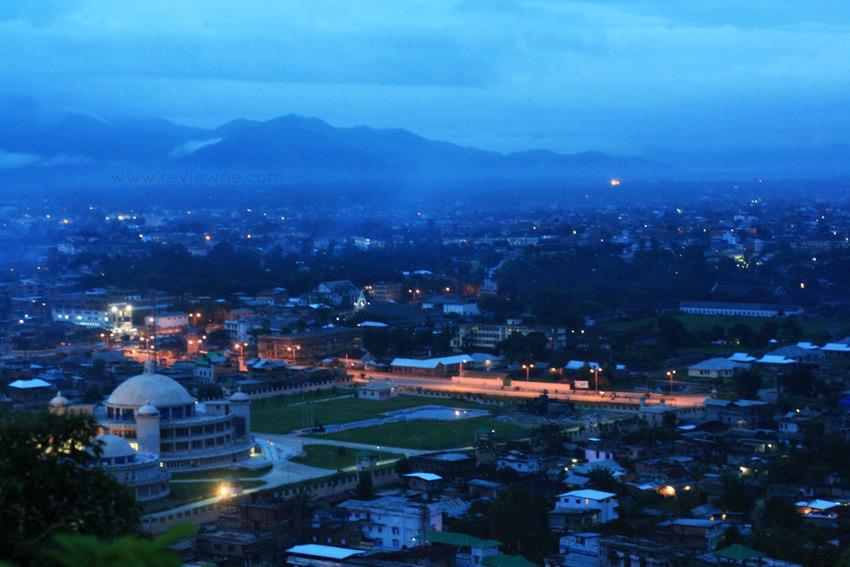
Imphal city nightview

Imphal is the state capital as well as the headquarters of the Imphal district. The civic administration of the city is under Imphal Municipal Corporation.

=== Civic administration ===
According to Census 2011, Imphal constitutes 42.13% of the total urban population in Manipur. Hence, the history of urban local governance is longer in Imphal than in other parts of the state. The British established the Town Fund Board in Imphal in 1915, which was headed by the then Political Agent Lt. Col. H.W.G. Cole and other nominated members. The Town Fund Board continued after Independence and merger with India in 1949 and it was not headed by the Chief Secretary of Manipur Administration. In 1956, the Assam Municipal Act, 1923 was extended to Manipur and the Imphal Municipal Board was formed with 12 elected members. The strength of the elected members of this Board was increased to 24 in 1961 and to 28 in 1972. Initially, the Municipal Board was established only to administer the areas in Imphal under the British Reserve, covering 3.10 km^{2} (1.20 sq mi) and 2,862 inhabitants. This was extended to 17.48 km^{2} (6.75 sq mi) in 1960, 18.25 km^{2} (7.05 sq mi) in 1970, and 76.58 km^{2} (29.57 sq mi) in 1972.

In 1992, the Municipal Board was upgraded to a Municipal Council under the Manipur Municipality Act, 1994. In 2014, the council was upgraded to the status of Municipal Corporation. There are 27 wards under the Municipal Corporation, each with its own elected councillor. There are eight committees and five sections at the corporation to govern the administration of the city.

The Commissioner of Imphal Municipal Corporation is Shri Maisnam Nando Singh and the Mayor is Shri L. Lokeshwar Singh.

There are Ward Development Committees in each ward to look after developmental activities at the ward level. The local ward councillor is the chairperson of the committee, which includes two elected and two nominated members as well. The last election to the corporation was in 2016, with INC winning 12 seats, BJP winning 10 seats, and independent candidates winning 5 seats. According to the Manipur Municipality Act, 1994, the mayor is indirectly elected by the elected councillors from among themselves. The first mayor of the corporation was Soram Sunil and was elected in 2016.

==== Representation in parliament ====
Manipur is divided into two constituencies for the purpose of Lok Sabha - Outer Manipur Parliamentary Constituency and Inner Manipur Parliamentary Constituency. Imphal city is part of the Inner Manipur Parliamentary Constituency. The last elections took place during the 2024 Indian general elections. Angomcha Bimol Akoijam from the Indian National Congress won the election with 374,017 votes.

== Civic amenities ==
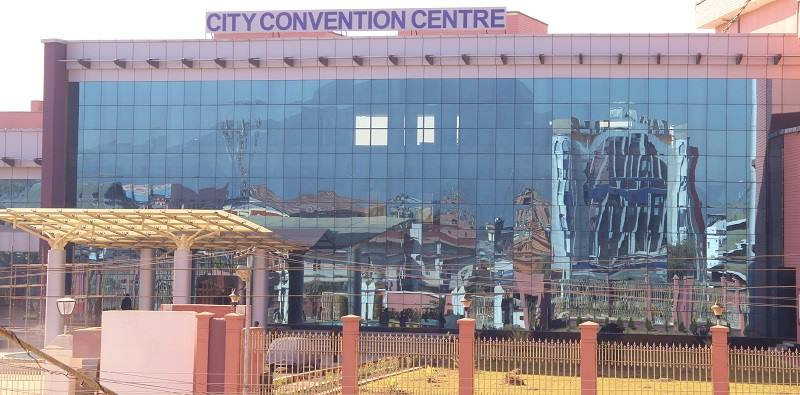
City Convention Centre

Manipur State Power Distribution Company Limited is responsible for electricity supply in the city. Public Health and Engineering Department of the Manipur Government looks after both water supply, and sewage and drainage in Imphal. Roads in the city are developed and maintained by the state Public Works Department. Imphal Municipal Corporation is responsible for Solid Waste Management. The state Department of Fire Services provides fire safety services in the city with one fire station, which is also the department headquarters.

== Tourist attractions ==
Imphal offers sites of religious and historical importance within and around the city. Kangla Palace (also known as Kangla Fort) is on the banks of the Imphal River. Kangla means "dry land" in the Meitei language. It was the palace of King Pakhangba, and has religious significance with multiple temples present within the complex. It is also significant in Manipur's history with the British. Bihu Loukon is an ancient star-shaped fort made of mud situated in Maklang, Imphal West District. It was discovered in 2013. Hiyangthang Lairembi Temple is religious site important to both the local religion, Sanamahism, and to Hinduism. The temple is noted for its annual Durga Puja festival.

India Peace Memorial at the Red Hills is located 12 km (7.5 mi) south of Imphal. The place was the scene of action and the theatre of the battle that took place between the British Army and the Japanese Forces fighting alongside the Indian National Army in World War II. Red Hill has now become a tourist attraction since the Japanese war veterans constructed a monument at the foot of this hill. The Imphal War Cemetery remembers Indian and British soldiers who fought and died in 1944 during World War II and is managed by the Commonwealth War Graves Commission.

Imphal is also home to the largest all women run market in Asia, called the Ima Keithel (Mothers' Market). It was established in the 16th century and hosts around 5,000–6,000 women vendors who sell a variety of products.

Nupi Lal Memorial Complex is a tribute to the courageous Manipuri women, who sacrificed their lives fighting for justice against the British on 12 December 1939. The Nupi Lal is considered to be one of the most important events in Manipuri history, and it is a symbol of the strength and courage of Manipuri women.

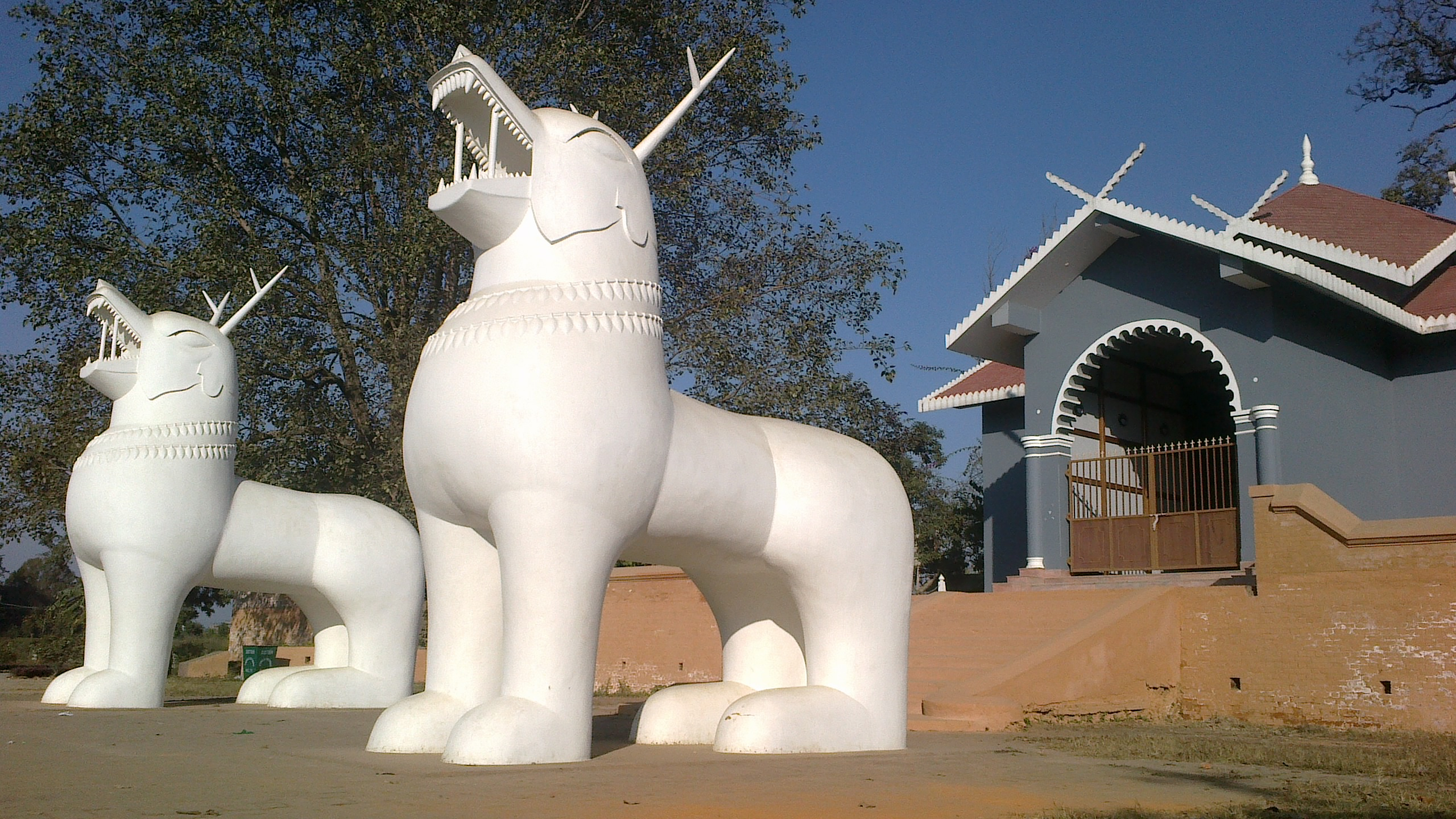
A pair of Kangla Sha dragons at Kangla Fort

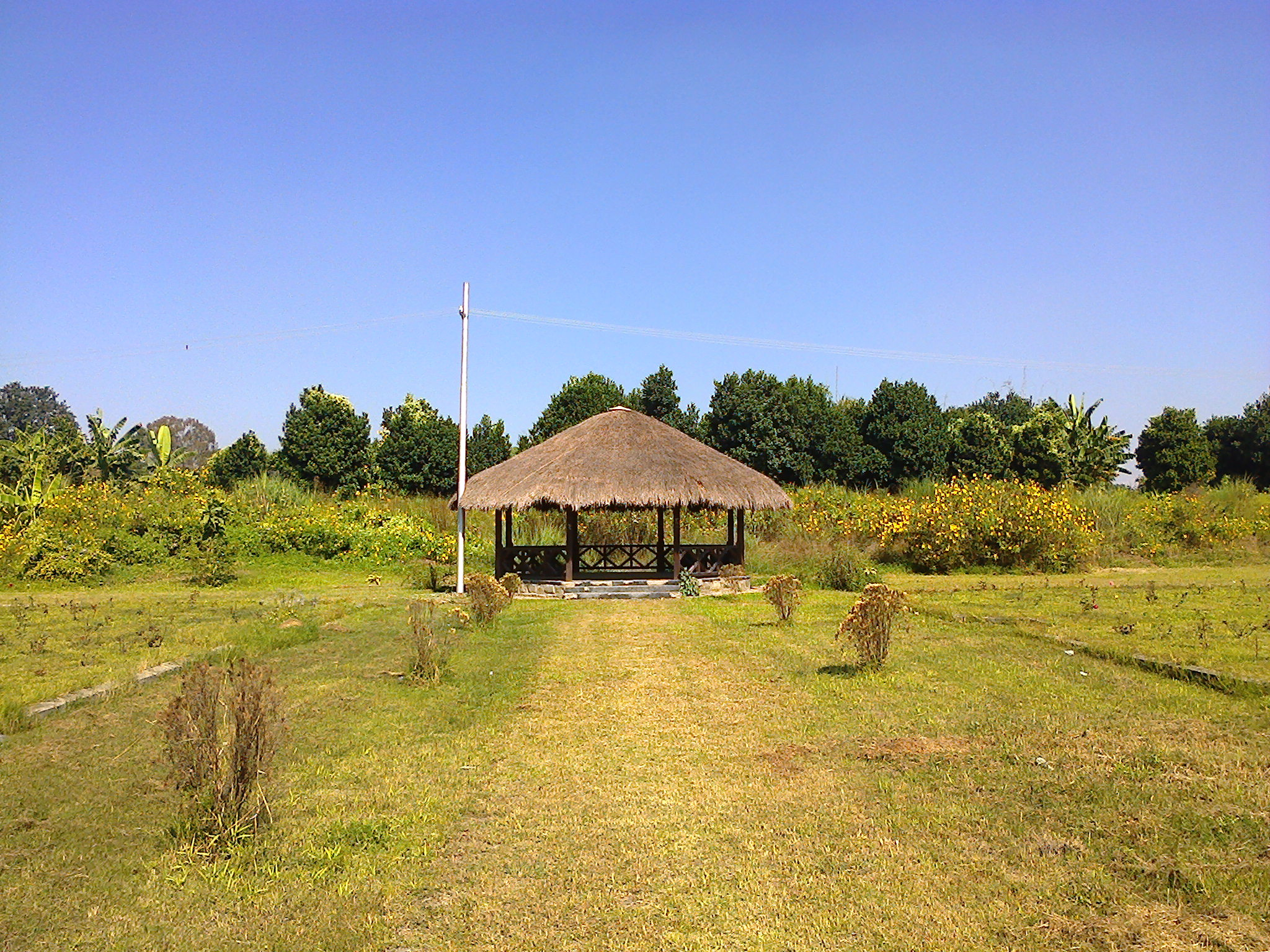
Bamboo huts in Kangla Fort complex

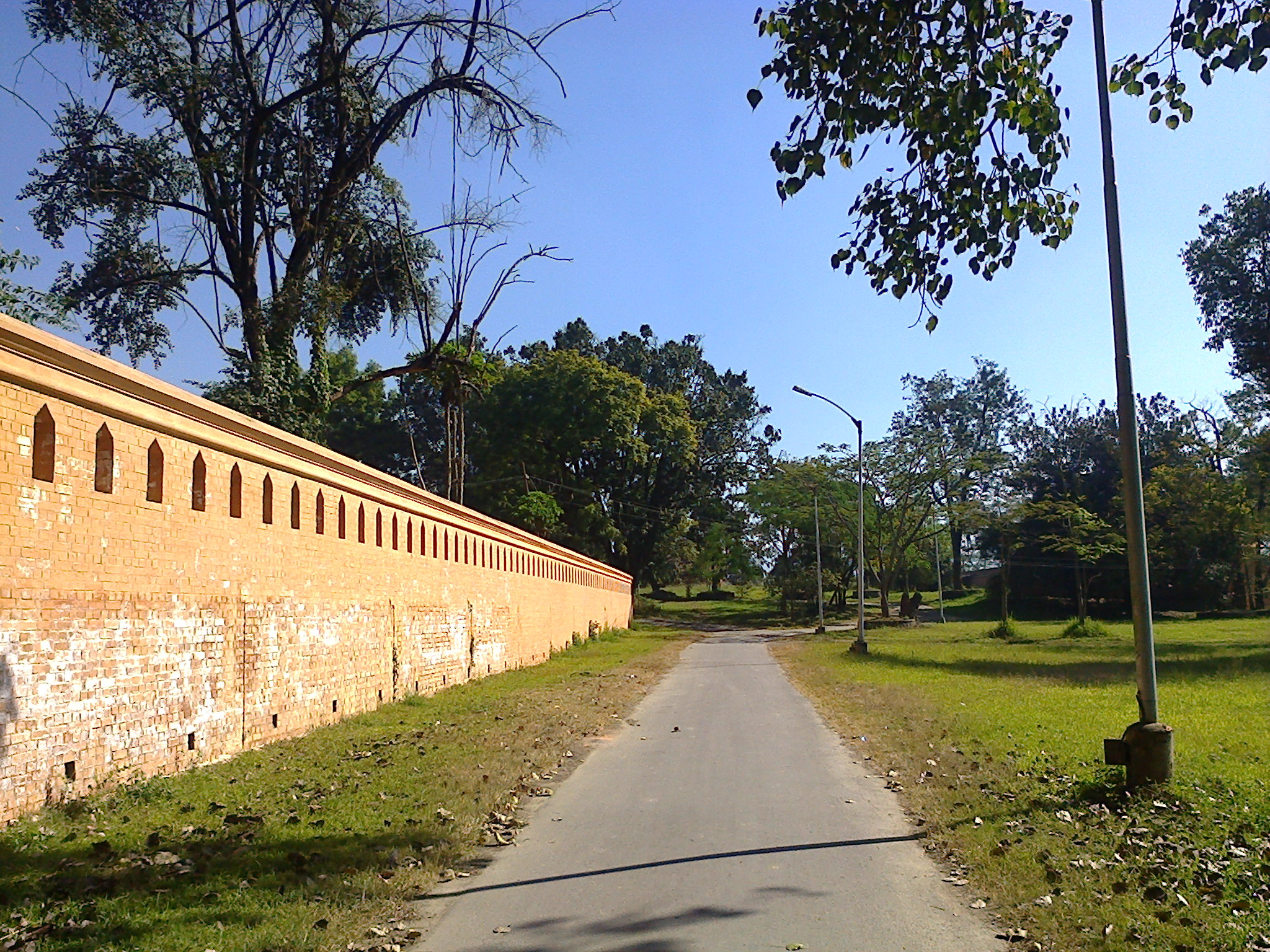
Ruins of Kangla Fort

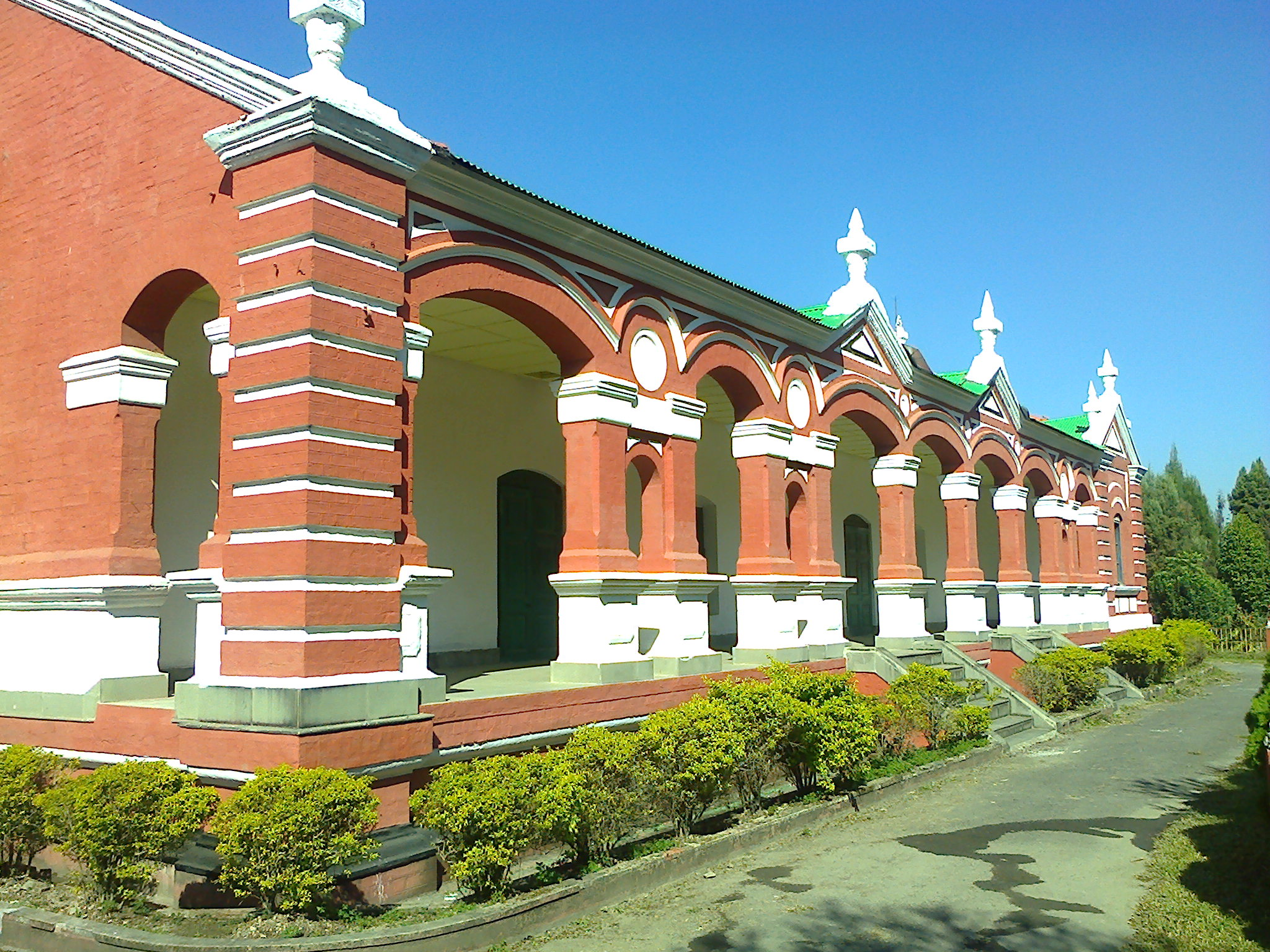
Kangla Museum houses

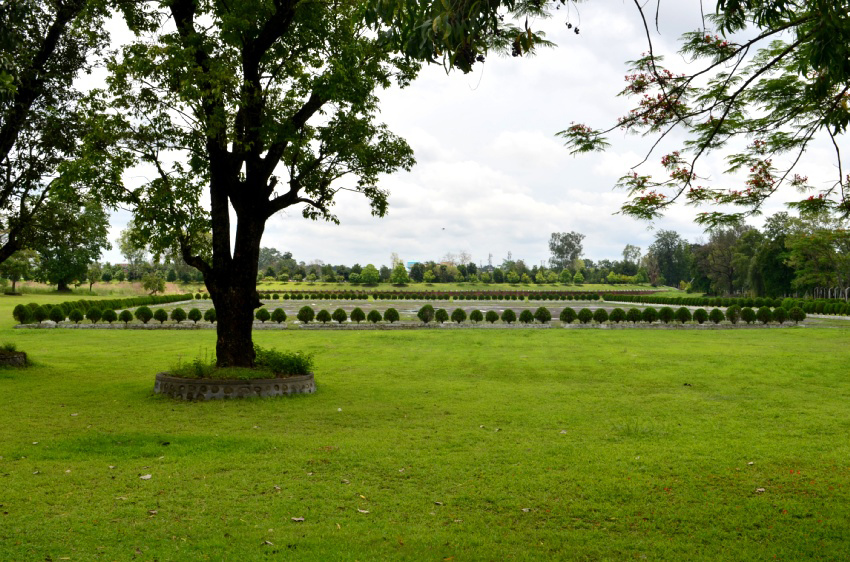
Kangla Fort Complex

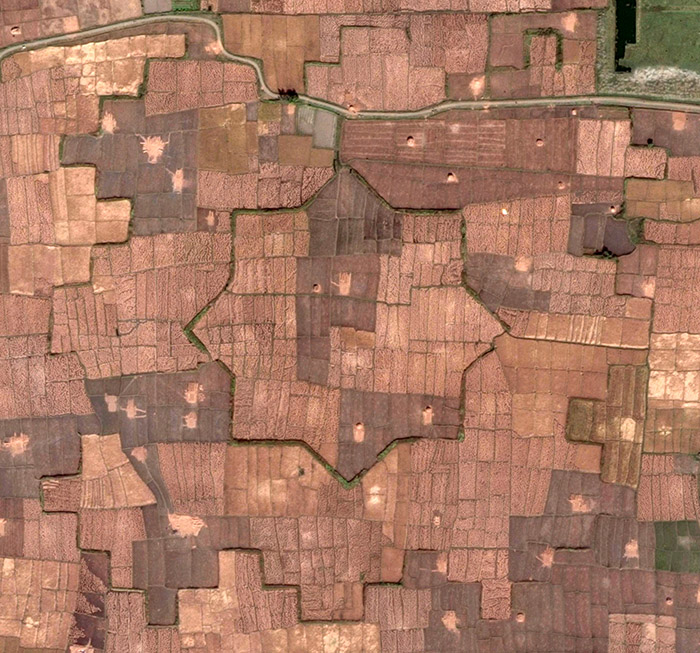
Bihu Loukon aerial view

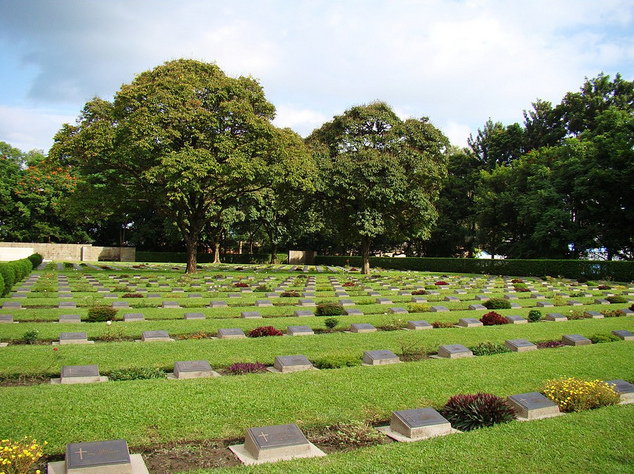
Imphal War Cemetery

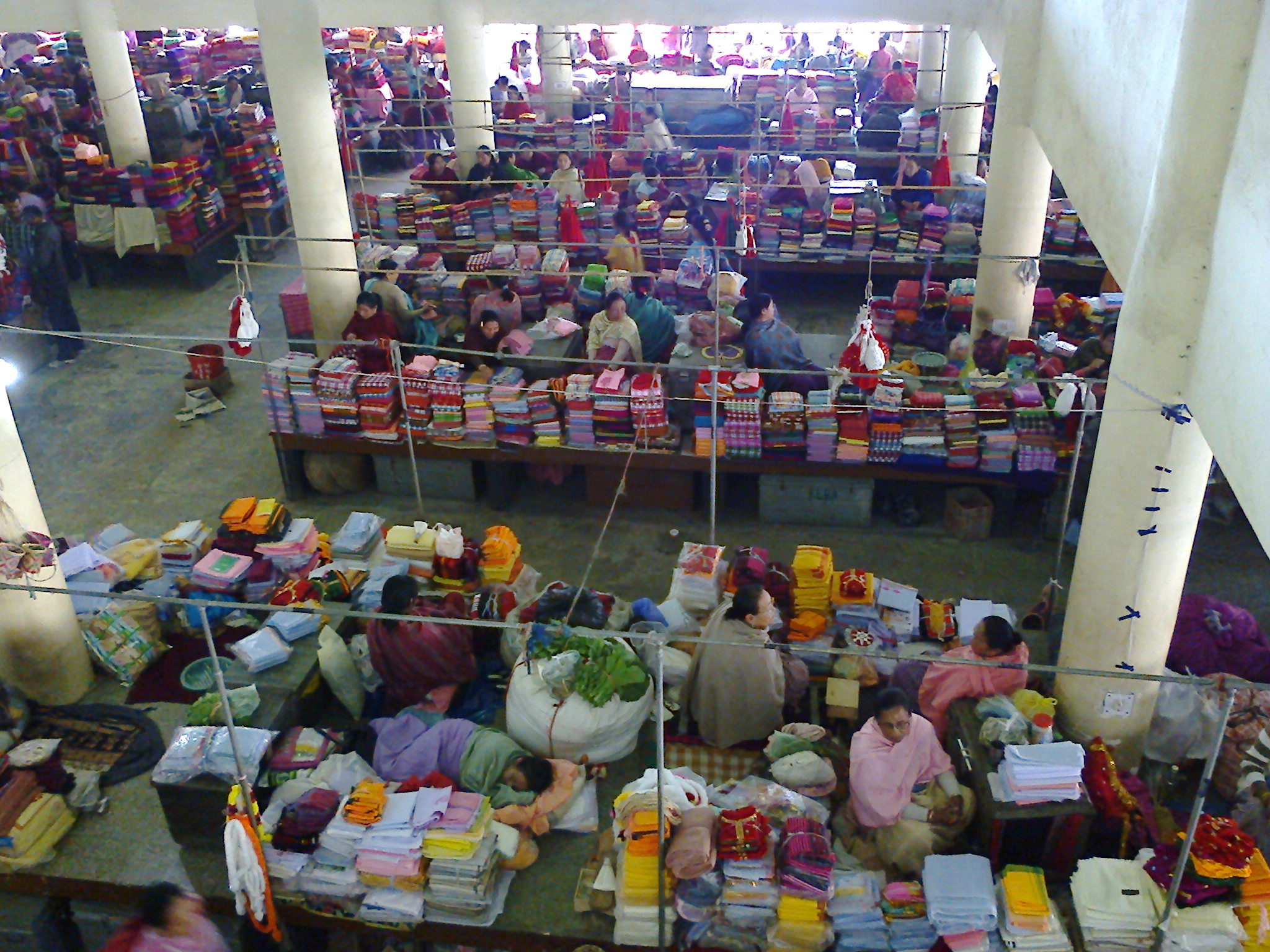
Women's Market (Ima Keithel)

== Transport ==
=== Air ===
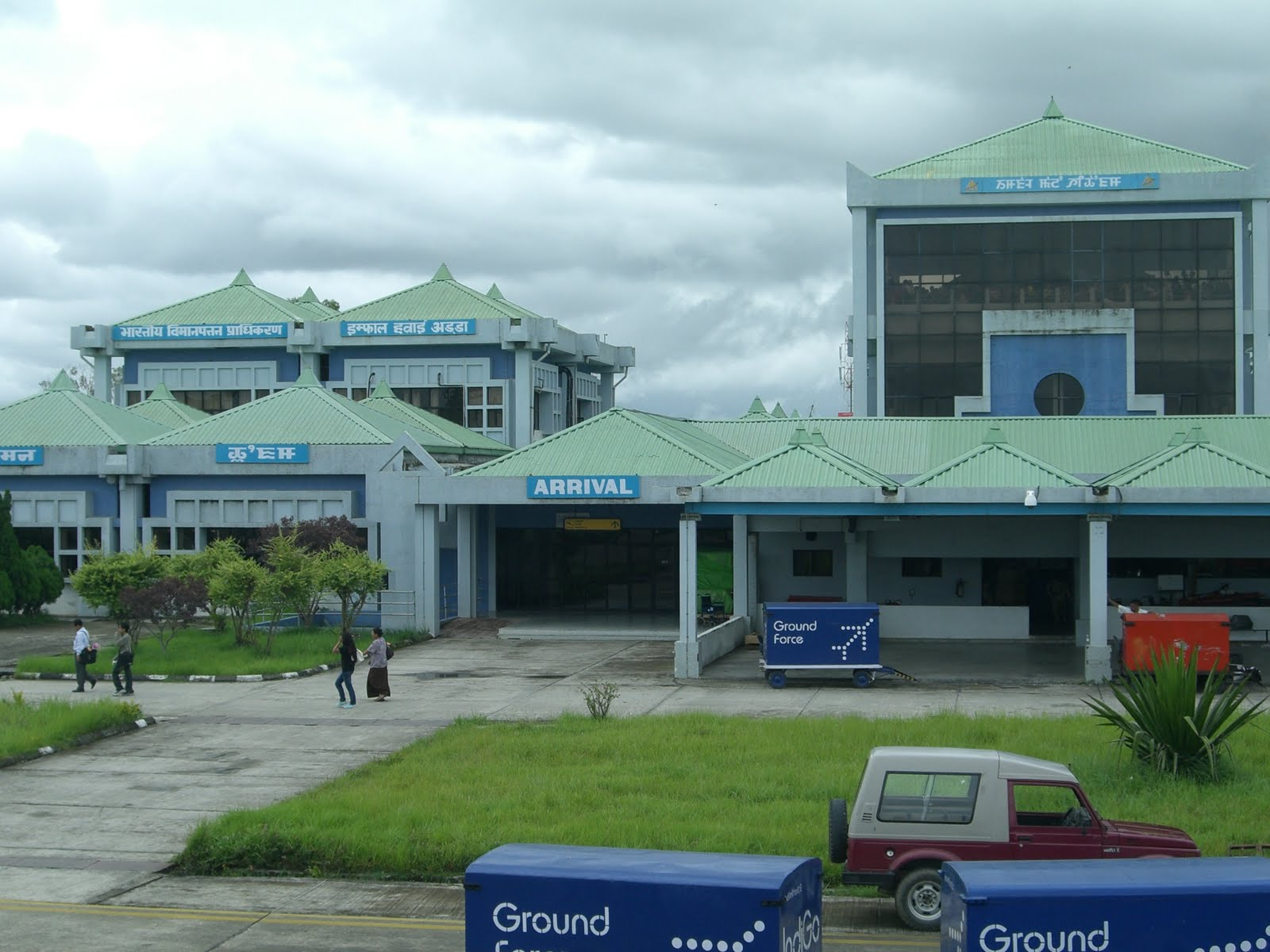
Bir Tikendrajit International Airport

Tulihal International Airport is 8 kilometres (5.0 mi) south of the city and has direct flights to major Indian cities.

=== Road ===
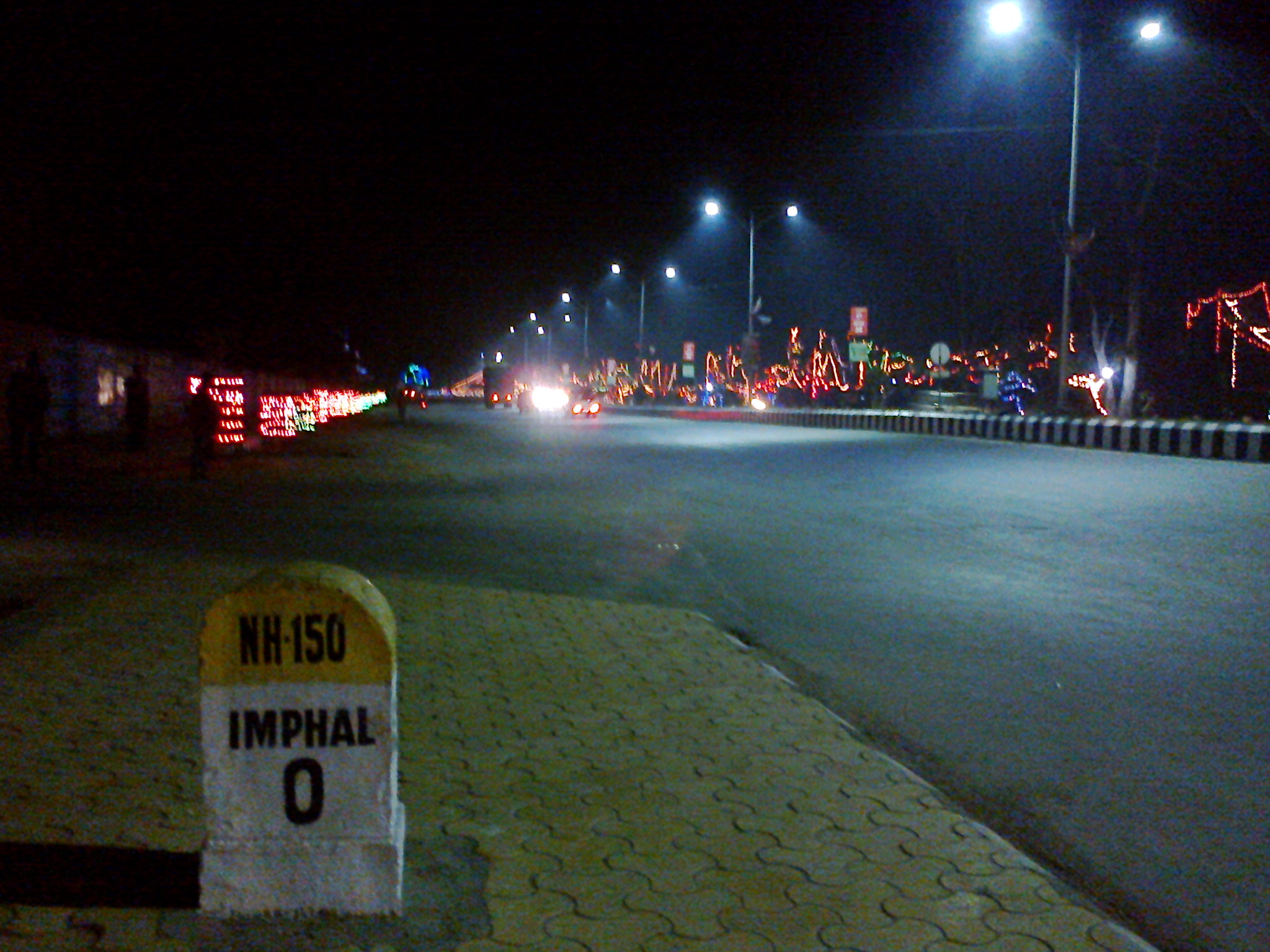
National Highway 150 in Imphal

Imphal is connected by the National Highway to major cities like Guwahati, Kohima, Agartala, Shillong, Dimapur, Aizawl, and Silchar.

=== Railway ===
In October 2012, India's Cabinet Committee on Infrastructure approved an extension of the Jiribam–Silchar railway to Imphal. The extension was expected to reach the city by 2019. The total length of the railway line is 110.62 km. The revised estimated cost of construction for the railway line sits at Rs 9658 crore, with Rs 4927.54 crore being spent as of 2019.

== Sports ==
Khuman Lampak Main Stadium is a multi-purpose stadium in Imphal. It is used mostly for football and athletics. The stadium holds 30,000 people and was built in 1999. This stadium lies inside the Khuman Lampak Sports Complex. Imphal based professional football clubs NEROCA FC and TRAU FC of I-League play their home matches at this stadium.

Polo has its origins in Manipur, India, where a traditional version called Sagol Kangjei was played centuries ago. British colonial officers in the 19th century adapted and popularised the game, leading to the modern version of polo that is played worldwide today.

== Education ==
=== Universities ===
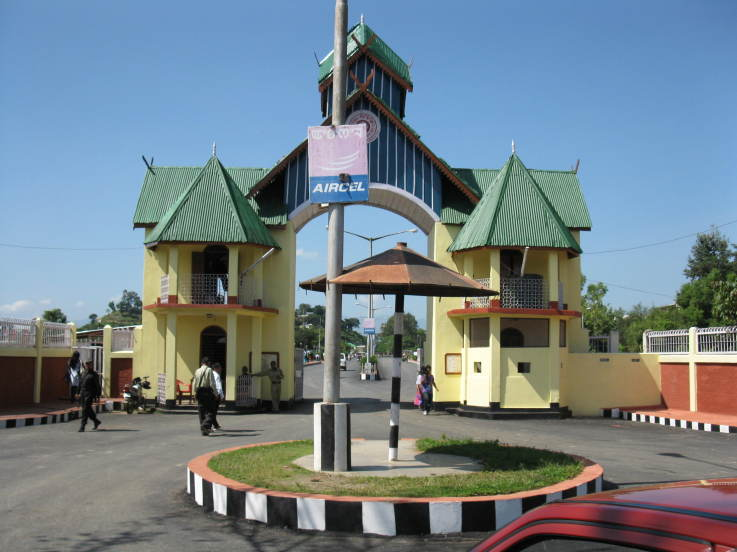
Manipur University main gate

- Manipur Central University
- Manipur Technical University
- Central Agricultural University
- National Sports University
- Manipur University of Culture

=== Technical colleges ===
- Indian Institute of Information Technology, Manipur
- Manipur Institute of Technology
- National Institute of Technology, Manipur
- Manipur Technical University

=== Medical colleges ===
- Regional Institute of Medical Sciences
- Jawaharlal Nehru Institute of Medical Science
- Shija Academy of Health Sciences

=== Schools ===
There are many schools in Imphal affiliated with the Central Board of Secondary Education and Indian Certificate of Secondary Education Board, as well as state government schools.

- Human Resource Development Academy(HRD), Ghari
- Areca School, Ragailong
- Catholic School, Canchipur
- Comet School, Changangei
- Dav Public School, Chingmeirong
- Don Bosco School Imphal, Chingmeirong
- Guru Nanak Public School
- Herbert School
- Jawahar Navodaya Vidyalaya, Khumbong (Imphal West), Imphal East, Bishnupur, Churachandpur, Ukhrul, Thoubal, Tamenglong and Senapati
- Johnstone Higher Secondary Public School
- Kids' Foundation School, Ghari
- Maria International Montessori School, Koirengei
- Meci Explorer Academy Changangei
- Kendriya Vidyalaya No 1 Imphal, Lamphelpat
- Kendriya Vidyalaya No 2 Imphal, Langjing
- Nirmalabas High School, Imphal
- Little Flower School
- Lodestar Public School
- Manipur Public School
- Sainik International School & College Imphal
- Savio English Higher Secondary Public School, Thangmeiband
- St. Anthony's English School & College Imphal
- St. John English High School, Nambol, Bishnupur District
- St. Joseph School
- St. Paul's English School
- Sanfort International School & College Imphal
- Sangai Higher Secondary Public School

== Healthcare ==
Imphal has many private and government hospitals that are open 24 hours.

- Regional Institute of Medical Sciences
- Shija Hospitals & Research Institutes
- City Hospital
- Imphal Hospital
- Raj Medicity
- Sky Hospital and Research Institute
- Mother's Care Hospital and Research Centre
- Apex Hospital
- Jawaharlal Nehru Institute of Medical Sciences
- Horizon Hospital and Research Institute
- Advanced Hospital
- Catholic Medical Centre
- Maipakpi Maternity and Child Hospital
- Iboyaima Hospital
- Asian Hospital
- Lamjingba Hospital
- Babina multi-speciality
- Babina oncology
- Rajamoni hospital
- Saina multi-speciality(SIMS)
- Rajmedicity multi-speciality(Underconstruction)

== Notable people ==
Sanjoy Singh, Number 1 DX class 1 night driver

== See also ==
- Churachandpur
- Dzüko Valley
- Keibul Lamjao National Park
- Loktak Lake
- Moirang, Manipur.
- Moreh
- Ukhrul
