= Indian Defence Accounts Service =

Government of India Civil Service

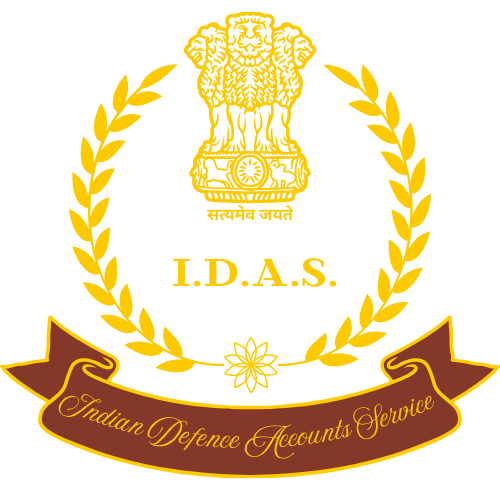
- Official logo

Service Overview
- Abbreviation: I.D.A.S.
- Country: India
- Controlling Authority: Ministry of Defence
- Legal personality: Governmental: Civil Service
- General nature: Defence Procurement, Payments, Accounts, Audit & Financial Advice

Service Chiefs
- Financial Advisor (Defence Services): Vishvajit Sahay, IDAS, Secretary (Defence Finance)
- Controller General of Defence Accounts (CGDA): Alka Nangia Arora, IDAS

Head of the Civil Services
- Cabinet Secretary: T. V. Somanathan, IAS

Indian Defence Accounts Service (IDAS) (Hindi: भारतीय रक्षा लेखा सेवा) is a civil service under Group A of the Central Civil Services of the executive branch of the Government of India.

The service provides Financial Advice, Payment, Accounts and Audit services to the Defence Services i.e. Indian Armed Forces (viz Army, Navy, Air Force and Coast Guard) and other allied organisations viz. Defence Public Sector Undertakings, Military Engineer Services, Border Roads Organisation, Defence Research and Development Organisation etc.

IDAS officers are Group-'A' gazetted civilian officers under Ministry of Defence, Government of India. They are primarily recruited through the Civil Services Examination, conducted by the Union Public Service Commission (UPSC) every year. The cadre controlling authority (CCA) of IDAS is the Controller General of Defence Accounts (CGDA). The CGDA is the service head of the Indian Defence Accounts Service and also heads the Defence Accounts Department.

== Profile ==
The IDAS officers form the management cadre of the Defence Accounts Department(DAD). The Defence Accounts Department has a history of more than two hundred and fifty years, tracing its origin to the year 1747, having been established to look after the Pay & Accounts of Military Services in India.

Presently, it is mandated to provide financial advice, payments, accounts and internal audit to the three Defence Services (Army, Navy, Air Force), Defence Research and Development Organisation (DRDO), Indian Coast Guard and other inter-services organisations. The concurrence of concerned financial advisors from the IDAS cadre at various echelons is needed before any expenditure is undertaken by these organisations under the administrative control of Ministry of Defence. They work at various managerial levels in various Ministries of Govt. of India under Central Staffing Scheme of DOPT, GOI.

== About Defence Finance ==
There is a separate Finance Division of the Raksha Mantralaya (Ministry of Defence) for dealing with all defence matters having a financial bearing. The head of this division i.e. the Ministry of Defence (Finance) is the Secretary (Defence Finance)/Financial Adviser (Defence Services).

With a view to ensuring greater efficiency in administration and quicker disposal of the cases, Ministry of Defence has been delegated enhanced financial powers in regard to expenditure met from the Defence Services Estimates. In matters within the delegated powers of the Ministry of Defence, Financial Adviser (Defence Services) or authorised representatives of Finance Division are to be consulted before exercise of financial powers. The Finance Division prepares the Defence Budget and the Civil estimates for the Civilian Establishments of the Ministry of Defence. It also furnishes the Heads of the Branches of the Armed Forces Headquarters and Heads of Civilian Departments/Organisations with all information necessary to enable them to discharge their financial responsibilities in respect of the grants allotted to them and advises them in regard to the preparation of proposals and the disposal of financial business generally. Finance Division is also fully associated with formulation and implementation of Defence Plans.

== Training, Initial appointments and Career prospects ==
The officers recruited to IDAS undergo elaborate training at various training academies and centres. First, a foundation training along with the All India Services at the Lal Bahadur Shastri National Academy of Administration (Mussoorie) for four months is imparted. After this, Induction Training is imparted at National Academy of Defence Financial Management, Pune. This is followed by a Professional Training Course at National Institute of Financial Management (Faridabad). Finally, there is a Departmental Training at National Academy Of Defence Financial Management at Pune. The entire training (including on-job training) lasts for a period of two years. After this, on passing the Departmental Examination, the probationers are confirmed into the Junior Time Scale grade.

The officers are then posted as either the Assistant Controllers of Defence Accounts (ACsDA) or Deputy Integrated Financial Advisers (Deputy IFAs). The IFAs and PCsDA/CsDA hold very important and critical responsibilities vis-a-vis the expenditure of the biggest budget for any Ministry under Government of India - the Ministry of Defence. They are part of executive machinery in their role as IFAs and help plan judicious use of allotted budgets to their zone/command/area of responsibility, therefore being closely involved in procurement, provisioning/tendering, financial-logistical planning, post-contract management etc.

An important aspect of IDAS is their fast pace of promotions, that is one of the fastest among other equivalent - Group-'A' Civil Services. They become Joint CDA/Joint IFA (in the Junior Administrative Grade) at about 9 years of service. They are promoted to CDA/IFA, in the Senior Administrative Grade (SAG) normally after 17 to 18 years of service.

CDA is equivalent to Income Tax/ GST Commissioner/ IG of police/ commissioner & Secretary to state government in an IAS cadre/ Joint Secretary to Government of India. IDAS officers get promoted to HAG, HAG+ and Apex level posts in cadre such as PCDA/PIFA, Addl CGDA and Spl CGDA and CGDA respectively. In addition, IDAS officers have been holding important deputation posts under Government of India, across various Ministries, Statutory Organisations and even appointments within various State Governments.

=== Rank Structure ===
Ranks, designations, and positions held by Indian Defence Accounts Service officers in their career
Grade / Scale (Level on Pay Matrix)	Posting in Indian Defence Accounts Service	Position in Government of India	Position in Order of precedence in India	Pay Scale (Basic Pay)
Apex Scale (Pay Level 17)	Controller General of Defence Accounts	Secretary	23	₹225,000 (US$2,300)
Higher Administrative Grade + (Pay Level 16)	Additional Controller General of Defence Accounts	Additional Secretary	25	₹205,400 (US$2,100)—₹224,400 (US$2,300)
Higher Administrative Grade (Pay Level 15)	Principal Controller of Defence Accounts	Additional Secretary	25	₹182,200 (US$1,900)—₹224,100 (US$2,300)
Senior Administrative Grade (Pay Level 14)	Controller of Defence Accounts	Joint Secretary	26	₹144,200 (US$1,500)—₹218,200 (US$2,300)
Selection Grade (Pay Level 13)	Senior Controller of Defence Accounts	Director		₹123,100 (US$1,300)—₹215,900 (US$2,200)
Junior Administrative Grade (Pay Level 12)	Joint Controller of Defence Accounts	Deputy Secretary		₹78,800 (US$820)—₹209,200 (US$2,200)
Senior Time Scale (Pay Level 11)	Deputy Controller of Defence Accounts	Under Secretary		₹67,700 (US$700)—₹208,700 (US$2,200)
Junior Time Scale (Pay Level 10)	Assistant Controller of Defence Accounts; Entry-level (Probationer)	Assistant Secretary		₹56,100 (US$580)—₹177,500 (US$1,800)

== See also ==
- Civil Services of India
- All India Service
