= Controller General of Defence Accounts =

Head of the Defence Accounts Department in India

Agency overview
- Formed: 1 October 1951
- Jurisdiction: Ministry of Defence, Government of India
- Headquarters: New Delhi
- Agency executive: Smt. Alka Nangia Arora, IDAS, Controller General of Defence Accounts
- Parent department: Ministry of Defence (Finance)
- Website: cgda.nic.in

The Controller General of Defence Accounts (CGDA) heads the Defence Accounts Department. Smt. Alka Nangia Arora is the present CGDA. The office functions under the Ministry of Defence, Government of India and is the cadre controlling authority of the Indian Defence Accounts Service, an organised Group 'A' Civil Service of Government of India.

As the Principal Accounting Officer for Ministry of Defence, the CGDA furnishes necessary information for the Appropriation Accounts to the Ministry of Defence. CGDA also prepares the Annual Consolidated Accounts of Defence Services Receipts & Charges and acts as the Principal Accounts Officer for Civil Estimates of the Ministry of Defence. DAD is also responsible for rendering the Annual Accounts for the various units and formations operating under the Ministry of Defence.

In addition, the Annual Audit Certificate for the Defence Services, rendered by the CGDA to the C&AG through Ministry of Defence, is tabled in the Indian Parliament.

== Office of the CGDA ==
Office of the CGDA is situated at Delhi. Current address is Ulan Batar Road, Palam, Delhi Cantt - 110010.

== List of CGDAs ==
The following is the list of officers of the Indian Defence Accounts Service (IDAS) who have held the post of CGDA since 1947:

List of CGDAs since 1947
Sl. No.	Name	Post Held	From	To				
1	Shri L. M. Ghatak	Military Accountant General	16.08.1947	08.05.1951				
2	Shri R. Jagannathan	Military Accountant General	09.05.1951	09.09.1951				
3	Shri A. Subrahmanyam	Controller General of Defence Accounts	26.02.1954	25.06.1956				
4	Shri R. N. Hazari	Controller General of Defence Accounts	26.06.1956	04.11.1956				
5	Shri Batuk Singh	Controller General of Defence Accounts	05.11.1956	20.09.1958				
6	Shri Phul Chand	Controller General of Defence Accounts	03.10.1958	06.11.1962				
7	Shri H. L. Wadera	Controller General of Defence Accounts	07.11.1962	09.09.1967				
8	Shri V. N. Sukul	Controller General of Defence Accounts	13.09.1967	25.03.1968				
9	Shri A. P. B. Nayar	Controller General of Defence Accounts	17.06.1968	09.03.1970				
10	Shri D. S. Nakra	Controller General of Defence Accounts	10.03.1970	31.12.1970				
11	Shri P. C. Bhattacharyya	Controller General of Defence Accounts	10.03.1971	05.12.1972				
12	Shri V. G. Kamath	Controller General of Defence Accounts	26.02.1973	20.01.1975				
13	Shri J. B. Martin	Controller General of Defence Accounts	17.03.1975	30.04.1978				
14	Shri C. P. Ramachandran	Controller General of Defence Accounts	01.05.1978	31.10.1978				
15	Shri B. M. Menon	Controller General of Defence Accounts	01.11.1978	31.07.1979				
16	Shri B. M. Prabhu	Controller General of Defence Accounts	02.08.1979	30.09.1980				
17	Shri R. Venkataraman	Controller General of Defence Accounts	17.11.1980	31.01.1986				
18	Shri S Swaminathan	Controller General of Defence Accounts	26.02.1986	30.04.1987				
19	Shri R. B. Kapoor	Controller General of Defence Accounts	10.06.1987	30.06.1988				
20	Shri R. Venkataratnam	Controller General of Defence Accounts	15.12.1988	24.12.1988				
21	Shri R Krishnamurthy	Controller General of Defence Accounts	01.01.1990	31.12.1990				
22	Shri R. K. Mathur	Controller General of Defence Accounts	14.03.1991	30.11.1991				
23	Shri Sanjib Mukherji	Controller General of Defence Accounts	04.02.1992	30.04.1992				
24	Shri B. G. Joshi	Controller General of Defence Accounts	11.05.1992	31.08.1993				
25	Shri Gian Swarup	Controller General of Defence Accounts	30.09.1993	27.04.1994				
26	Shri S. A.Ventakatarayan	Controller General of Defence Accounts	01.05.1994	30.06.1994				
27	Shri U. S. Prasad	Controller General of Defence Accounts	06.09.1994	31.12.1994				
28	Shri D. K. Chet Singh	Controller General of Defence Accounts	11.03.1995	18.10.1995				
29	Shri P. R. Sivasubramanian	Controller General of Defence Accounts	20.12.1995	20.11.1996				
30	Shri N. Gopalan	Controller General of Defence Accounts	11.03.1997	30.06.2001				
31	Shri M Kumaraswami	Controller General of Defence Accounts	01.07.2001	05.03.2002				
32	Shri B Banerjee	Controller General of Defence Accounts	10.04.2002	31.07.2002				
33	Shri G. C. Bhandari	Controller General of Defence Accounts	01.08.2002	31.12.2003				
34	Shri Jnan Prakash	Controller General of Defence Accounts	04.05.2006	30.06.2007				
35	Smt H. K. Pannu	Controller General of Defence Accounts	01.07.2007	31.03.2008				
36	Smt Bulbul Ghosh	Controller General of Defence Accounts	01.04.2008	31.12.2009				
37	Smt Nita Kapoor	Controller General of Defence Accounts	01.01.2010	31.05.2010				
38	Shri Nand Kishore	Controller General of Defence Accounts	01.06.2010	31.12.2011				
39	Shri Virendra Diwan	Controller General of Defence Accounts	01.01.2012	31.03.2012				
40	Smt Priti Mohanty	Controller General of Defence Accounts	01.04.2012	29.10.2012				
41	Shri Suhas Banerjee	Controller General of Defence Accounts	30.10.2012	31.10.2012				
42	Shri Arunava Dutt	Controller General of Defence Accounts	01.01.2012	30.06.2013				
43	Kum Vandana Srivastava	Controller General of Defence Accounts	05.07.2013	31.10.2014				
44	Shri Arvind Kaushal	Controller General of Defence Accounts	01.11.2014	31.05.2015				
45	Shri S. S. Mohanty	Controller General of Defence Accounts	01.06.2015	30.09.2015				
46	Smt Shobhana Joshi	Controller General of Defence Accounts	01.10.2015	31.05.2016				
47	Shri S. K. Kohli	Controller General of Defence Accounts	08.07.2016	29.09.2016				
48	Shri N. Neihsial	Controller General of Defence Accounts	02.12.2016	28.02.2017				
49	Smt Veena Prasad	Controller General of Defence Accounts	01.03.2017	31.01.2018				
50	Smt Madhulika P Sukul	Controller General of Defence Accounts	01.02.2018	31.08.2018				
51	Shri R. K. Nayak	Controller General of Defence Accounts	22.04.2019	30.04.2019				
52	Shri Sanjiv Mittal	Controller General of Defence Accounts	01.05.2019	30.06.2021				
53	Shri Rajnish Kumar	Controller General of Defence Accounts	26.07.2021	30.06.2022				
54	Shri S G Dastidar	Controller General of Defence Accounts	04.09.2023.	31.03.2024				
55	Smt Devika Raghuvanshi	Controller General of Defence Accounts	02.07.2024	28.02.2025				
56	Dr Mayank Sharma	Controller General of Defence Accounts	01.03.2025	31.07.2025				
57	R. K. Arora	Controller General of Defence Accounts	01.08.2025	30.10.2025				
58	Vishvajit sahay	Controller General of Defence Accounts	01.11.2025	30.04.2026				
59	Anugraha Narayana Das	Controller General of Defence Accounts	01.05.2026	31.07.2026 60	श्रीमती अलका नाांगिया अरोड़ा, भा.र.ले.से.	Controller General of Defence Accounts	01.08.2026	Present
