= List of populated places in Imphal West district =

Villages in Imphal West district of Manipur, India

The Imphal West district of Manipur state in India has four sub-divisions. As of 2023, it has 4 municipal councils or municipal corporations, and 178 villages. The 2011 Census of India recorded 16 towns (including 3 municipal councils) and 124 villages in the district.

== Blocks ==
The district has the following subdivisions:

Name	Population	Effective literacy rate	Sex ratio	SC population %	ST population %	Census code (2011)
Lamshang (Lamsang)	84856	80.16%	1023	17.44%	2.79%	01879
Patsoi	70665	86.1%	1024	0.2%	4.28%	01880
Lamphelpat (Lamphel)	221422	91.59%	1048	0.65%	7.56%	01881
Wangoi	141049	80.69%	1013	0.1%	1.44%	01882

== Towns ==
The district has following towns:

Name	Type	Block	Population	Effective literacy rate	Sex ratio	SC population %	ST population %	Census code (2011)
Lamsang	Nagar Panchayat	Lamshang	8130	85.89%	1119	0.27%	5.97%	801485
Sekmai Bazar	Nagar Panchayat	Lamshang	5065	82.96%	1053	62.92%	1.13%	801486
Nambol (part)	Municipal Council	Patsoi	5431	88.75%	1025	0.04%	1.23%	801469
Lamjaotongba	Census Town	Patsoi	10593	85.2%	1082	0.14%	5.74%	270116
Langjing	Census Town	Patsoi	5451	90.62%	960	0.68%	6.02%	270117
Imphal (major part)	Municipal Council	Lamphelpat	186538	91.71%	1047	0.57%	8.9%	801487
Naoriya Pakhanglakpa	Census Town	Lamphelpat	7501	89.58%	1059	0.01%	0.27%	270122
Sagolband (part)	Census Town	Lamphelpat	4964	92.65%	1042	0.36%	0.04%	270123
Takyel Mapal	Census Town	Lamphelpat	5775	90.28%	980	6.08%	1.39%	270124
Samurou (Major part)	Municipal Council (Nagar Panchayat in 2011)	Wangoi	10721	82.32%	1033	0.0%	0.02%	801488
Mayang Imphal	Municipal Council	Wangoi	24239	74.17%	1023	0.0%	0.29%	801489
Thongkhong Laxmi Bazar	Municipal Council (Nagar Panchayat in 2011)	Wangoi	14878	77.17%	1009	0.0%	1.4%	801490
Wangoi	Municipal Council (Nagar Panchayat in 2011)	Wangoi	9106	82.28%	994	0.0%	1.28%	801491
Lilong (Imphal West)	Nagar Panchayat	Wangoi	12427	86.84%	1045	0.03%	0.02%	801492

== Villages ==
The district has following villages:

=== Lamphel sub-division (Central SDC Circle) ===
Name	Population	Effective literacy rate	Sex ratio	SC population %	ST population %	Census code (2011)
Heinoukhongnembi	3591	88.72%	1079	0.0%	0.19%	270118
Maibam Leikai	3030	92.24%	1051	0.0%	0.23%	270119
Ahongsangbam Leikai	1175	93.16%	1113	0.0%	0.17%	270120
Sorokhaibam Leikai	1927	92.61%	1063	0.0%	0.1%	270121

The following villages are not listed in the 2011 census directory:

- Chingamkham Leikai
- Ploice Bazar
- Chingamathak
- Chingamakha
- Ningthoujam Leikai
- Keishamthong
- Babupara
- Khagempalli
- Naoriya Pakhanglakpa
- Singjamei
- Oinam Thingel
- Sagolband
- Bijoygovinda
- Uripok
- Khwai Bazar
- Lalambung
- Kangla
- Khwai Lalambung
- Thangmeiband
- Kabo Leikai
- Meitei Langol
- Lamphel Pat
- Iroisemba
- Takyel Khongbal

=== Lamsang subdivision ===
==== Lamsang SDC Circle ====
Name	Population	Effective literacy rate	Sex ratio	SC population %	ST population %	Census code (2011)
Kameng	974	82.96%	936	0.0%	0.0%	270059
Phumlou	2138	73.95%	969	0.0%	0.0%	270058
Koutruk	472	69.98%	1098	62.5%	1.69%	270060
Lairensajik	705	76.4%	964	0.0%	0.0%	270061
Kadangband	1262	68.59%	966	39.22%	0.63%	270062
Lamlongei	1028	53.98%	988	0.0%	0.1%	270063
Mayang Langjing	2895	87.16%	988	0.21%	0.0%	270064
Kangchup	286	83.46%	1072	6.64%	14.34%	270065
Kharang Koireng	1303	76.65%	1068	72.29%	6.75%	270066
Kha-Leirenkabi (Kha-Lairenkabi)	79	66.67%	975	0.0%	0.0%	270067
Awang Leirenkabi (Awang Lairenkabi)	851	80.97%	1012	0.0%	0.0%	270068
Lambal	802	73.42%	1062	0.0%	0.0%	270077
Lamshang / Lamsang (part)	282	79.83%	945	0.0%	0.0%	270078
Akham	500	83.94%	1083	0.0%	0.0%	270079
Ngariyambam	449	90.18%	1088	0.0%	0.0%	270080
Heibongpokpi (Heirongpokpi)	595	86.1%	997	0.0%	0.0%	270081
Sanjenbam	749	81.1%	966	0.0%	0.0%	270082
Phayeng (Chakpa Phayeng)	2728	75.17%	1045	93.51%	1.65%	270083
Haorang Sabal	761	77.66%	1232	0.0%	0.0%	270090

The following villages are not listed in the 2011 census directory:

- Akham
- Laingamkhul
- Kangchup
- Taothong
- Lamdeng
- Lamdeng Khunou

==== Salam SDC Circle ====
Name	Population	Effective literacy rate	Sex ratio	SC population %	ST population %	Census code (2011)
Thangjing Khullen	1070	80.68%	1062	0.0%	0.0%	270069
Maklang	1271	86.48%	929	0.0%	0.08%	270070
Luker	1485	81.21%	1020	0.0%	0.0%	270071
Salam Keikhu	1974	78.63%	1048	0.0%	0.0%	270072
Awang Khunou (Awangkhunou)	2878	82.9%	1014	0.03%	0.17%	270073
Ngairangbam	2578	76.78%	1020	0.0%	0.0%	270074
Longa Koireng (Loinga Koireng)	963	77.4%	953	39.77%	23.57%	270075
Kabui Anouba	0	NA	NA	NA	NA	270076
Tairenpokpi	892	76.68%	1027	95.85%	1.57%	270084
Khongakhul	71	93.33%	1152	0.0%	0.0%	270085
Polangsoi	181	60.27%	1011	0.0%	0.0%	270086
Kangdabi	314	88.39%	1107	0.0%	0.0%	270087
Atom Khuman	157	61.36%	1343	0.0%	0.0%	270088
Haorang Keirel	894	87.94%	996	0.0%	0.0%	270089
Kiyam	426	81.2%	919	0.0%	0.0%	270091
Tharoijam	1302	81.24%	1044	0.0%	0.0%	270092

==== Sekmai SDC Circle ====
Name	Population	Effective literacy rate	Sex ratio	SC population %	ST population %	Census code (2011)
Ekpan Khullen (Akpal Khullen)	0	NA	NA	NA	NA	270025
Ekpal Khunou (Akpal Khunou)	0	NA	NA	NA	NA	270026
Kuraopokpi	0	NA	NA	NA	NA	270024
Heinoupokpi	0	NA	NA	NA	NA	270027
Tokpa Khul (Thokpa Khul)	0	NA	NA	NA	NA	270028
Thonamba	0	NA	NA	NA	NA	270029
Tumnoupokpi	0	NA	NA	NA	NA	270030
Tumuyon Khunou (Thumyom Khunou)	0	NA	NA	NA	NA	270031
Malken Halkhothang (Makel Helakthang)	0	NA	NA	NA	NA	270032
Tumuyon Khullen (Thumyom Khullen)	0	NA	NA	NA	NA	270033
Keithelmanbi	131	96.4%	365	0.76%	0.76%	270034
Khoiren Tampak	0	NA	NA	NA	NA	270035
Mantri Leikai	543	87.29%	996	0.0%	0.0%	270056
Kanglatongbi (Kanglatombi)	7152	87.77%	1083	0.53%	7.45%	270036
Sekmai (part)	5162	79.22%	977	31.13%	10.19%	270037
Keingam	247	72.56%	915	0.0%	0.0%	270038
Kanto	977	70.87%	990	27.02%	1.43%	270039
Khurkhul	6450	78.16%	955	60.7%	4.76%	270040
Maharabi	1275	81.3%	1021	7.92%	0.16%	270041
Mandop Yumpham	16	73.33%	778	0.0%	0.0%	270042
Awang Laikinthabi (Leikinthabi)	1669	79.69%	1030	0.0%	0.06%	270043
Tingri	520	74.45%	1031	0.0%	0.0%	270044
Potsangbam Khoiru (Potsangbam Khoirung)	2298	77.37%	1012	0.0%	0.0%	270045
Thouriphai (Thouri Phi)	280	81.22%	879	0.0%	0.0%	270046
Tendongyan	1212	75.31%	1037	0.0%	0.0%	270047
Konsakhul	0	NA	NA	NA	NA	270048
Senjam Khunou (Semjam Khunou)	1985	75.85%	977	0.0%	0.0%	270049
Loitang Khunou	1081	86.87%	965	9.62%	0.28%	270050
Loitang Laikinthabi (Loitang Leikinthabi)	424	67.78%	1019	0.0%	0.47%	270051
Pheidinga	406	81.2%	1020	0.99%	0.0%	270052
Khonghampat (Khongampat)	2464	72.7%	1048	0.28%	0.0%	270053
Loitang Khullen	1215	71.55%	1008	0.0%	0.0%	270054
Loitang Sandum	230	75.0%	1054	0.87%	0.0%	270055
Khamral (Khamarang / Khamran)	609	85.37%	1078	0.0%	0.0%	270057

=== Patsoi subdivision ===
==== Patsoi SDC Circle ====
Name	Population	Effective literacy rate	Sex ratio	SC population %	ST population %	Census code (2011)
Changangei	4581	90.61%	1023	0.04%	5.61%	270113
Yurembam	3701	85.12%	1061	0.0%	7.57%	270109
Patsoi	5358	89.33%	1057	0.0%	0.0%	270110
Taobungkhok (Tabungkhok)	2559	87.65%	973	0.0%	0.04%	270112
Ghari	2078	89.52%	1033	1.44%	0.0%	270114
Sangaiprou Maning	3126	92.39%	1097	1.31%	16.44%	270115
Langjing Achouba	609	83.33%	1044	0.0%	15.11%	270111

The following villages are not listed in the 2011 census directory:

- Lamjao Thongba
- Langjing

==== Konthoujam SDC Circle ====
Name	Population	Effective literacy rate	Sex ratio	SC population %	ST population %	Census code (2011)
Moidangpok Khullen	3429	75.56%	932	0.0%	2.95%	270094
Moidangpok Khunou	783	70.4%	900	0.0%	0.0%	270095
Khaidem	1750	76.72%	955	0.06%	0.06%	270102
Khumbong	2374	83.95%	1070	0.0%	0.88%	270103
Lanshonbi (Lansombi)	2597	81.4%	1018	0.42%	0.04%	270104
Konthoujam (Konthoujam)	4025	86.78%	1024	0.07%	12.67%	270105
Top Khabi	1261	89.96%	992	0.0%	0.0%	270106
Yarou Bamdiar	2195	85.4%	1017	0.0%	7.43%	270107
Yarou Meitram	0	NA	NA	NA	NA	270108
Awang Jiri	1477	90.67%	1021	0.0%	0.0%	270099
Heigrujam	2285	79.11%	961	0.0%	3.37%	270100
Sajirok	449	80.41%	1050	0.0%	0.0%	270101
Maha Koireng	0	NA	NA	NA	NA	270096
Manamyang	0	NA	NA	NA	NA	270097
Meisnam Kangmong (Maisnam Kangmong)	4553	85.15%	1020	0.02%	0.0%	270098
Leingangpokpi	0	NA	NA	NA	NA	270093

The following villages are not listed in the 2011 census directory:

- Thangtek
- Awang Phoijing
- Kha Jiri

=== Wangoi subdivision ===
==== Hiyangthang SDC Circle ====
Name	Population	Effective literacy rate	Sex ratio	SC population %	ST population %	Census code (2011)
Malom Tuliyaima	3096	91.42%	1045	0.06%	0.06%	270127
Malom Tulihal	2879	90.75%	650	0.0%	0.17%	270126
Meitram	1644	85.5%	1017	0.0%	0.0%	270128
Ningombam	2595	88.1%	1029	0.0%	0.0%	270129
Kodompokpi (Kadampokpi)	3562	84.46%	1000	0.11%	0.03%	270130
Lairenjam	2651	84.6%	1021	0.0%	0.0%	270131
Wakching Khullen	1304	74.47%	1031	0.0%	0.0%	270132
Irom Meijrao (Irom Meijao)	2373	87.09%	997	0.0%	0.08%	270133
Sangaiprou Mamang (Sangaiparou)	4613	88.51%	1058	0.43%	0.5%	270125
Takhellambam Konjil	337	91.32%	1030	0.0%	0.0%	270141
Langthabal Phuramakhong (Langthabal Phura Makhong)	941	93.11%	1110	0.0%	0.11%	270136
Langthabal Lep (Langthabal Lap)	3528	89.09%	1026	0.0%	0.06%	270135
Mongsangei	3639	80.6%	896	0.08%	0.3%	270137
Hiyangthang	4778	85.25%	1071	0.0%	2.91%	270134

==== Lilong Chajing SDC Circle ====
Name	Population	Effective literacy rate	Sex ratio	SC population %	ST population %	Census code (2011)
Leiphrakpam Leikai (Laiphrakpam Leikai)	1759	86.67%	1114	0.0%	0.0%	270139
Oinam Leikai	1182	90.35%	1077	0.25%	0.0%	270138
Langthabal Mantrikhong	2564	86.13%	1068	0.0%	0.0%	270152
Naral Konjil	1007	85.23%	1022	0.0%	0.4%	270140

The following villages are not listed in the 2011 census directory:

- Naorem Leikai
- Langthabal Kunja
- Chajing (Part-1)
- Chajing (Part-2)
- Karam
- Haoreibi
- Naran konjil

==== Mayang Imphal SDC Circle ====
Name	Population	Effective literacy rate	Sex ratio	SC population %	ST population %	Census code (2011)
Laphupat Tera	4129	67.25%	989	0.0%	0.02%	270150
Komlakhong	2385	52.75%	1049	0.0%	0.0%	270149
Phoubakchao	3588	61.28%	1000	0.0%	0.0%	270148
Thongam	1121	83.76%	1107	0.0%	0.0%	270147
Hangoon (Hungun)	866	73.2%	1107	0.0%	0.0%	270146
Hayel	474	78.02%	1000	0.0%	0.0%	270145
Uchiwa	3783	77.08%	1032	0.0%	4.73%	270144
Samushang (Samusang)	1645	71.95%	876	0.0%	0.06%	270151

The following villages are not listed in the 2011 census directory:

- Bangoon
- Mayang Imphal
- Kokchai
- Chabung Company
- Chirai

==== Wangoi SDC Circle ====
Name	Population	Effective literacy rate	Sex ratio	SC population %	ST population %	Census code (2011)
Chongtham Kona	411	76.72%	860	0.0%	0.0%	270143
Bitra Urokhong (Bitra Urokhok)	1685	78.65%	1008	0.0%	0.36%	270142

The following villages are not listed in the 2011 census directory:

- Mutum Phibou
- Laiphrakpam
- Lakhuhuidrom
- Wangoi Top
- Thiyam Leisangkhong
- Wangoi (village)
- Oinam Sawombung
- Naorem Chaphrou
- Samurou (village)
- Heiningsoi
