= Phayeng (disambiguation) =

Phayeng is a place in Manipur. It may also refer to:

- of or relating to Meitei culture of Phayeng region
- Phayeng (Meitei dialect), a spoken regional variety of Meitei language
- Phayeng (extinct dialect), a historical dialect once spoken in the Phayeng region
- Phayeng railway station, a transport institution in Phayeng region
