= Kao (bull) =

Bull in Meitei folklore

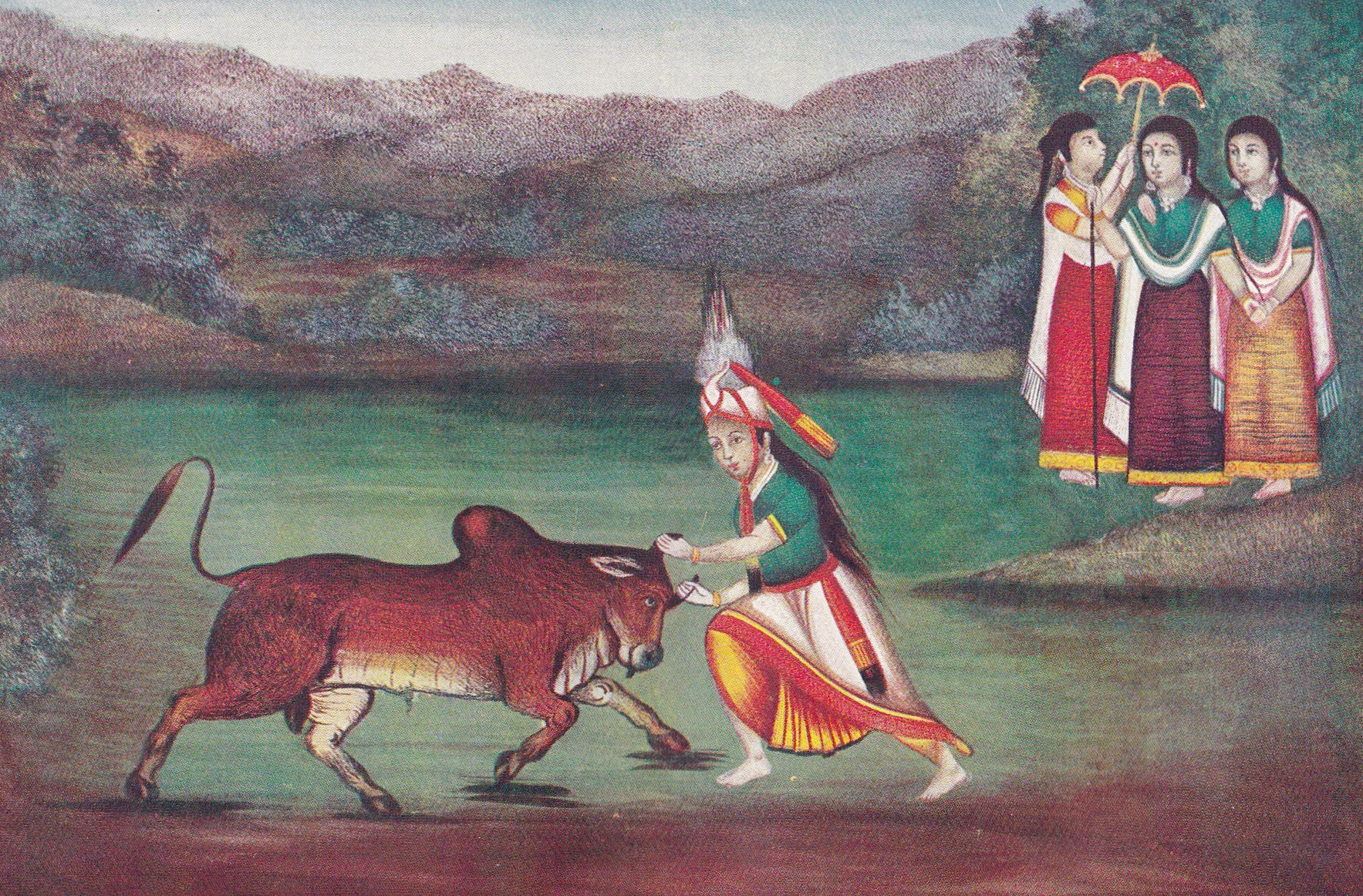
- Kao being captured by Khuman Khamba

Creature information
- Other name(s): Kau, Kaw, Cao, Cau, Caw, Cow
- Grouping: Legendary creature
- Sub grouping: Meitei legendary creatures
- Folklore: Meitei folklore (Manipuri folklore)

Origin
- Country: Ancient Manipur (historical); India (present)
- Region: Moirang, Manipur

Kao (Meitei pronunciation: /káo/ (Note: also pronounced as "Cow" ("/kaʊ/"))) is a legendary divine bull captured by Khuman Khamba in Meitei mythology and folklore of ancient Moirang realm. It appears in the legend of Kao Phaba (Old Manipuri: Kau Phaapa), also known as Khambana Kao Phaba (Old Manipuri: Khampana Kao Phaapa) of the Khamba Thoibi epic.

== Mythology ==
Kongyamba, a rich nobleman of the Angom clan, met a group of women from the Khuman kingdom in a place called Moirang, and asked them why they were fishing there. They told him that a dangerous bull had killed many people near the water, so they could not fish. Kongyamba then tricked his servant Khamba into catching the bull, by pretending, before the king, that he was possessed by a divine spirit, and claimed that the god Thangjing spoke through him. Saying he was "sated with offerings of flesh and fish", he demanded to be given the flesh of the bull that was terrorizing the people of Khuman. He added that "my servant Khamba vows that he will bring it for my honor and for the welfare of the State." When the king asked Khamba about his promise, he denied it, but in the end was forced to acquiesce and to try and catch the bull if it was the God's will; the king promised him he could marry Princess Thoibi if he were successful.

=== Embassy to Khuman kingdom ===
The king of Moirang sent an embassy to the king of Khuman. The embassy proposed to organize the great sport of capturing the wild bull. The Khuman king agreed. A grand colosseum was built for the event. The colosseum could hold a capacity of the audiences from both the two kingdoms.

=== Capture by Khamba ===
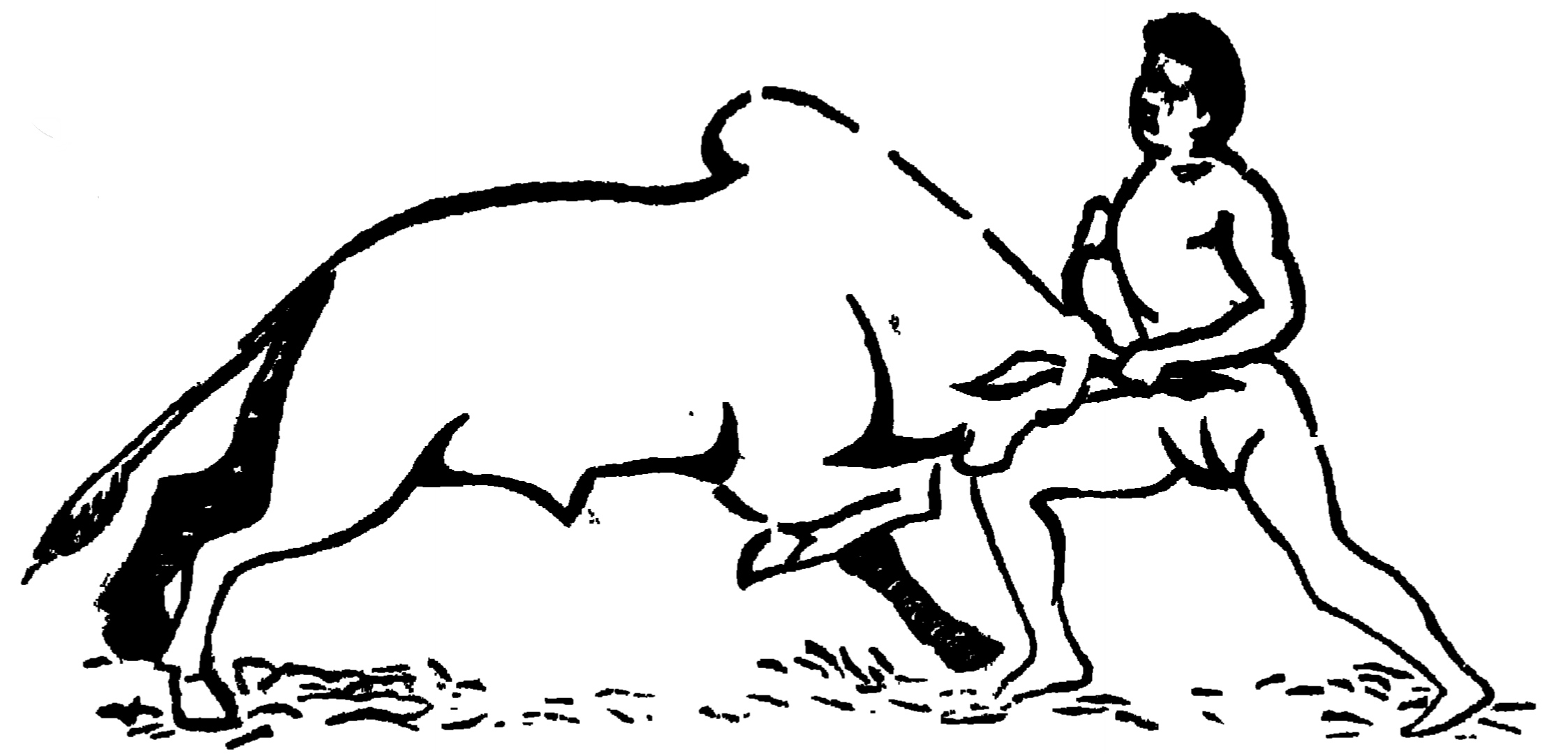
Khamba capturing the Kao

Khamnu revealed a secret to Khamba. She said that the bull had once belonged to their father. She told him that if Khamba told the bull their father's name, it would be tame and gentle:

"This great bull was once the Lord of your father's herd. Go to him, speak your father's name in his ear, and show him this Rope of silk."

On the day of the adventure, Khamba stood face to face with the bull. The bull ran towards him with its dangerous horns. Khamba bent a little to the side. The people watching asked him if he was afraid. Khamba answered that he was waiting for a good position. Then, he stood on firm ground and caught the bull. The strong bull carried him away into the thick woods. Khamba did everything as his sister had told him to do. Immediately, the wild bull became tame and gentle. Khamba brought the bull back.

On the way back, Kongyamba came to him before anyone saw them. Kongyamba pretended to help Khamba to hold the bull. Kongyamba held the rope. When everyone saw, Kongyamba claimed that he had captured the bull. He added that he even rescued Khamba who had fallen into the ditch. Once again, there was a great conflict between Khamba and Kongyamba over the claim. The two kings could not find out who was right. So, Kongyamba was asked to fight the bull within an enclosure. But Kongyamba was afraid of the bull. He climbed up on the heights to save himself. Khamba faced the bull bravely. He once again captured the bull.

== In popular culture ==
In popular culture, Kao appears in arts, books, movies, theatres and many others.

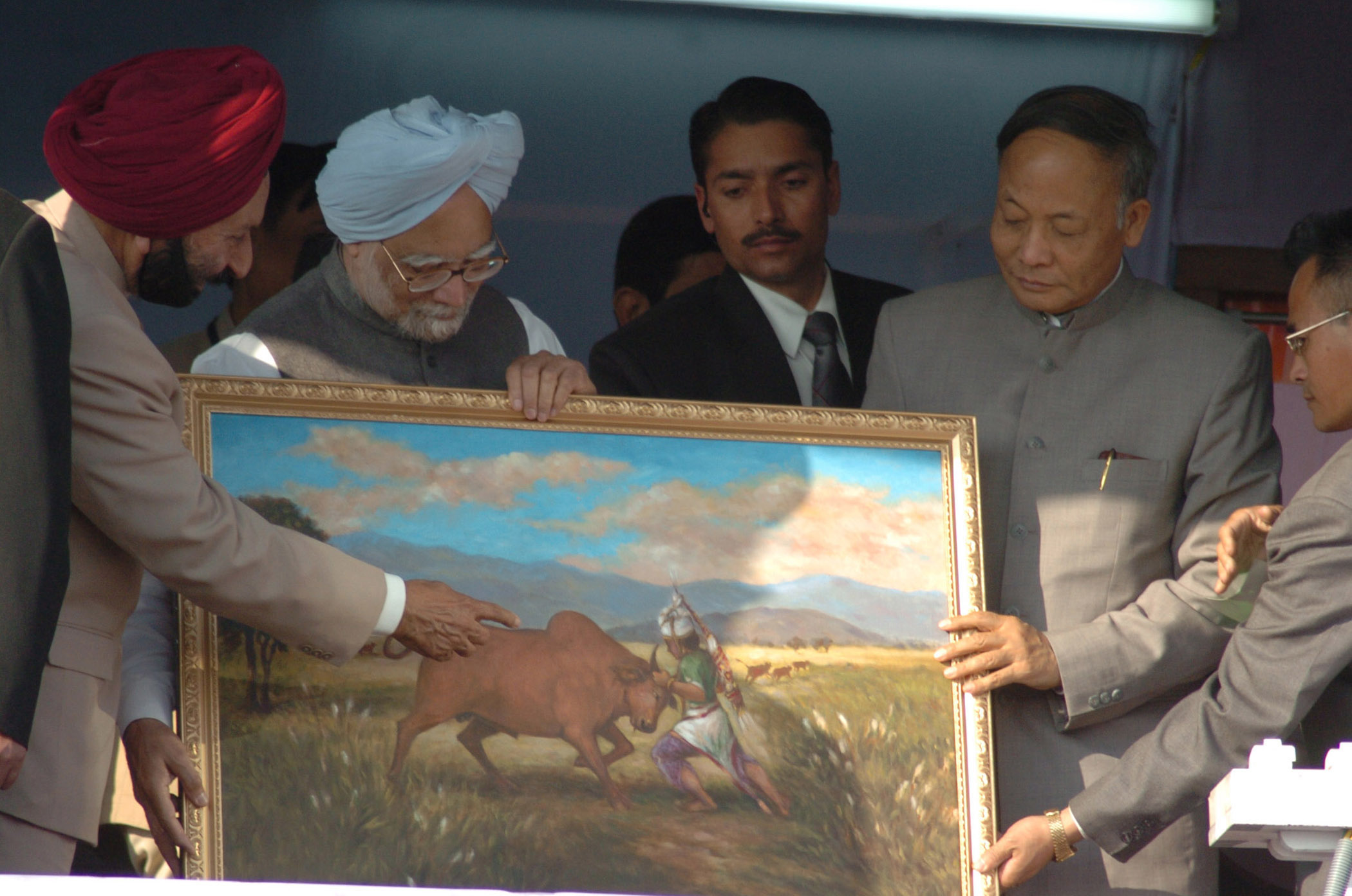
Manmohan Singh, the then prime minister of India, being presented a memento of a painting depicting Khuman Khamba capturing the "Kao" bull, by Dr. Shivinder Singh Sidhu, the then Governor of Manipur and Okram Ibobi Singh, the then Chief Minister of Manipur, on the occasion of the foundation stone laying ceremony of three projects, National Academy of Sports, Convention Center and Manipur Institute of Technology, in the Kangla in Manipur on 2 December 2006

=== Painting ===
==== Khambana Kao Phaba ====
In 2001, Khambana Kao Phaba (painting) was kept in the permanent collection of the Indira Gandhi Rashtriya Manav Sangrahalaya (IGRMS) Museum, Bhopal, India. In July 2019, the painting was selected as the "Exhibit of the Month" in the same museum.

=== Theatre ===
==== Kao, the sacred bull ====
In 2011, "Kao, the sacred bull" was produced by the Laihui Ensemble. This theatrical show was based on the story of the bull Kao. According to the story, an Oracle said that the King of Moirang will soon die and his people will lead a miserable life. The only solution told was to offer the powerful bull roaming in the Khuman kingdom to God Thangjing. Orphan Khuman Khamba was chosen to capture the bull. He was known for his bravery and goodness. To capture the bull with no harm to it was not easy. Khamba's motherly sister Khamnu disclosed to him the secrecy of the bull. The bull was once domesticated and treated as a family member during the good days of their parents.

==== Kao Faba ====
In 2020, a Shumang Kumhei named "Kao Faba" was produced by Western Cultural Association in Manipur. It was sponsored by the Sangeet Natak Akedemi of New Delhi, India. The play was released in the Iboyaima Shumang Leela Shanglen, Palace Compound, Imphal. The play is based on the legend of capturing the bull in Ancient Moirang.

== See also ==
- Cretan bull
- Minotaur
- Taurus
