= Khambana Kao Phaba =

2001 Manipuri oil painting by M Betombi Singh

- Khamba capturing the bull (Note: The Meitei language term for "bull" is "Kao" itself.) (English)
- "Khambana Kao Phaba", the Meitei canvas painting by M Betombi Singh and Gopal Sharma
- Artists: M Betombi Singh and Gopal Sharma
- Year: 2001
- Medium: Oil and Canvas
- Subject: Khuman Khamba and Kao bull
- Condition: Preserved
- Location: Indira Gandhi Rashtriya Manav Sangrahalaya, Bhopal
- Owner: Indira Gandhi Rashtriya Manav Sangrahalaya
- Accession: Indira Gandhi Rashtriya Manav Sangrahalaya

The Khambana Kao Phaba (Meitei for 'Khamba capturing Kao bull') is a 2001 oil canvas painting by Manipuri artists, M. Betombi Singh and Gopal Sharma. The painting shows the capture of powerful Kao bull by hero Khamba. It is one of the most well known museum series "Exhibit of the Month" of the Indira Gandhi Rashtriya Manav Sangrahalaya in India. It was exhibited for a whole month of July, 2019.

== Title and subject ==
The painting shows an epic legend of Ancient Moirang Kingdom. Angom Nongban Kongyamba, the villain, was jealous of Khuman Khamba, the hero. So, he set a death-trap of Khamba. The hero was asked to capture the giant bull. But Kongyamba's dream of Khamba being killed by the bull was not fulfilled. Khamba knew the secrecy of the bull. The bull was once the head of Khamba's father's cattle herd. During the capture, Khamba whispered his father's name to the bull's ear. He also showed a silk rope to the bull. The bull recognised Khamba. So, the wild beast was tamed.

== History ==
The artwork was painted by late artist M Betombi Singh in the Sana Konung Palace in Imphal, Manipur. The artist was 93 years old when he completed the artwork. In 2001, the painting was registered into the permanent collection of the Indira Gandhi Rashtriya Manav Sangrahalaya Museum. After that, the artwork was visited by many well known people including RK Chaturvedi, AS&FA, Union Ministry of Culture of India. The painting was kept in Veeth Sankul indoor exhibitions and library of the museum.

== Exhibition ==
In July 2019, the painting was introduced as the "Exhibit of the Month" of the Indira Gandhi Rashtriya Manav Sangrahalaya by RK Chaturvedi, AS&FA, Union Ministry of Culture of India. The exhibition was curated by Nongmaithem Sakamacha. Sakamacha was the Museum Associate of Indira Gandhi Rashtriya Manav Sangrahalaya, Bhopal, India.

== Other paintings ==
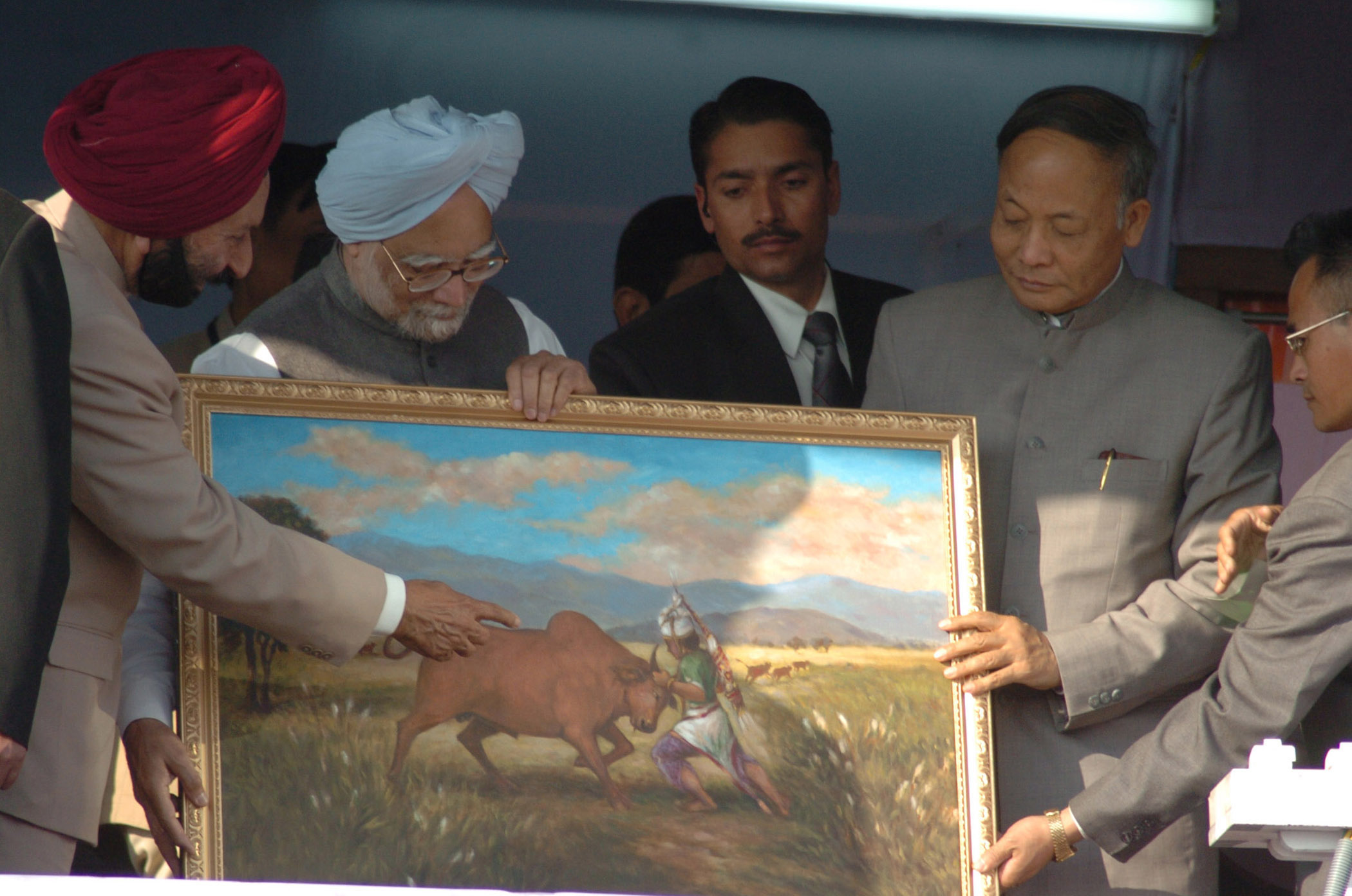
Manmohan Singh, the then prime minister of India, being presented a memento of a painting depicting Khuman Khamba capturing the "Kao" bull, by Dr. Shivinder Singh Sidhu, the then Governor of Manipur and Okram Ibobi Singh, the then Chief Minister of Manipur, on the occasion of the foundation stone laying ceremony of three projects, National Academy of Sports, Convention Center and Manipur Institute of Technology, in the Kangla in Manipur on the 2nd of December, 2006

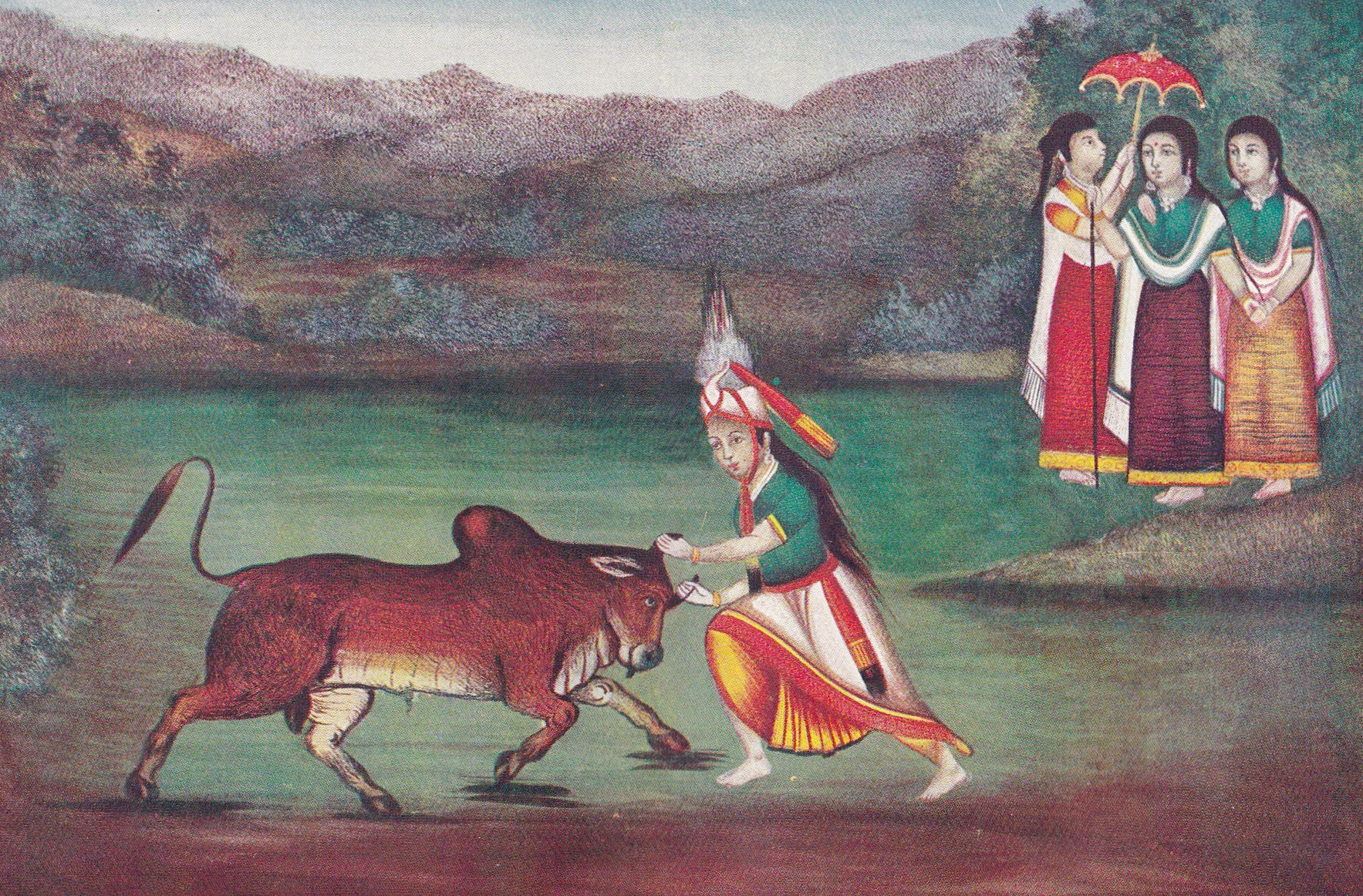
"Khamba and Thoibi (The Capture of the Wild Bull)"

== See also ==
- Poubi Lai
