= Kiyam =

Kiyam ꯀꯤꯌꯥꯝ
- Village
- Location in Manipur, India Kiyam (India)
- Coordinates: 24.868°N 93.865°E
- Country: India
- State: Manipur
- District: Imphal West
- Subdivision: Lamshang

Area
  - Total: 325.01 ha (803.1 acres)

Population
  - Total: 426
- Time zone: UTC+5:30 (IST)

Kiyam is a village in the Lamshang subdivision of Imphal West, Manipur, India. It is administered by a local Sarpanch.

The pincode of Kiyam is 795113.

== Demographics ==
As per the 2011 Census;

- Population: 426 (222 males and 204 females).
- Sex ratio: 919 females per 1000 males.
- Children under 6: 59
- Child sex ratio: 513 females per 1000 males
- Literacy rate: 81.2%

== See also ==
- List of populated places in Imphal West district

== Education ==
The Kiyam PS School which was founded in 1964, is a co-education school and consists of Grade I to Grade V. It is located in the Haorang block of Imphal West district.
