= Sekmai (disambiguation) =

Sekmai (or Sengmai) is a village in Manipur, India. It may also refer to:

- of or relating to Meitei culture of Sekmai region.
- Sekmai (Meitei dialect), a living dialect of Meitei language.
- Sekmai (extinct dialect), a dialect once spoken in Sekmai region, which was replaced by Meitei language.
- A type of Meitei traditional liquor produced in the Sekmai region
- Sekmai Bazar, a town in Manipur.
- Sikhong Sekmai, a place in Manipur.
- Sekmai Assembly constituency, an administrative-electoral unit in Manipur.
