= Hiyangthang Lairembi Temple =

Meitei temple in Hiyangthang, Manipur

- (Meitei: Hiyangthang Lairembi Laishang)

Religion
- Affiliation: Sanamahism (Meitei religion)
- District: Imphal West
- Region: Hiyangthang
- Deity: Hiyangthang Lairembi
- Festivals: Lai Haraoba of Sanamahism, Panthoibi Iratpa, Durga Puja of Hinduism (Hindu festival is also celebrated since the reign of King Garib Niwaj in 18th century AD)
- Patron: King Senbi Kiyamba (1467-1508 AD) of Ningthouja dynasty

Location
- Location: Hiyangthang
- State: Manipur
- Country: India

Architecture
- Type: Meitei architecture (Manipuri architecture)
- Style: Meitei architecture (Manipuri architecture)
- Creator: Sarangthem Luwangba
- Established: 15th century AD
- Temple: 1

The Hiyangthang Lairembi Temple is a temple dedicated to Goddess Hiyangthang Lairembi (also known as Irai Leima) of Meitei religion (Sanamahism). The building is situated on the hilltop of Heibok Ching in the Hiyangthang, Manipur. Thousands of devotees visit the holy site during the Lai Haraoba festival of Sanamahism as well as Durga Puja of Hinduism.

== History ==
The worship of Goddess Hiyangthang Lairembi (alias Irai Leima) was started by the reign of King Senbi Kiyamba (1467-1508 AD) in Manipur. Right from his era, Sarangthem family members hold grand feasts (Chaklen Katpa) every year in honor of the goddess.

In the 18th century AD, during the reign of King Garib Niwaj (alias Pamheiba), Goddess Hiyangthang Lairembi (alias Irai Leima) was converted to Hindu goddess Kamakhya (a form of Durga). The 3rd day of Durga Puja is celebrated as the "Bor Numit" (literally, Boon Day) in the temple.

On 22 March 1979, an association was formed to worship Hiyangthang Lairembi (Ireima), the traditional goddess.

== Legends ==
Irai Leima (later known as Hiyangthang Lairembi) was an exceptionally beautiful princess of Heibok Ching. King Heibok Ningthou, her father was a wizard and black magician. One day, King Kwakpa (Kokpa) of Khuman dynasty saw Irai Leima fishing in the Liwa river. He fell in love with her. He proposed her. Her answer was that her parents' wish will be her wish. So, King Kwakpa and his subjects presented Heibok Ningthou many gifts. King Kwakpa was about to marry Irai Leima if her father didn't reject or to bring her by force if her father rejected. Seeing the immodesty of Khuman Kwakpa, Heibok Ningthou turned all the presents into stone. Kwakpa returned home disappointed.

One day, King Kwakpa got drunk with a juice of the roots of Tera plant (Bombax malabaricum). He went to meet Irai Leima, riding on a Hiyang boat. Seeing him coming, she fled to Pakhra Ching. Kwakpa followed her. Seeing all these, Heibok Ningthou turned the Hiyang boat into stone and the oar into a growing tree. Getting furious, Kwakpa turned on Heibok Ningthou to kill him. Then, Heibok Ningthou turned Khuman Kwakpa also into a stone. Irai Leima saw all this and was frightened. She ran away from her own father. She passed the Pakhra Ching, crossed the Liwa river and hid herself inside the grain storehouse of Sarangthem Luwangba. When Luwangba and his good lady Thoidingjam Chanu Amurei left the house for paddy field, Irai Leima came out from her hideout. Meanwhile, she did all the household works for them. When they returned home, she also returned to her hideout again. They were amazed at this but it happened daily. So, one day, the man returned home earlier than normal timing. He found out what was really going on. But when he came near Irai Leima, she was gone below the grain storehouse. He saw nothing under the granary. He was astonished at this. So, he discussed the matter with his clan members. They searched her everywhere but didn't find her anymore.

Irai Leima came to the dream of Sarangthem Luwangba. She told him that she was merged into his clan and became his daughter. The story was told to King Senbi Kiyamba of Ningthouja dynasty. The King sent maibas and maibis to inspect the case. The maibas and the maibis concluded the strange lady to be a goddess and the deity to be worshipped. King Kiyaamba told Luwangba to worship her. From that year onwards, Irai Leima was worshipped as a goddess.

The first day on which Luwangba saw Irai Leima was the first Monday of the Meitei lunar month of Lamta (Lamda). And the day on which the maibas and maibis examine the case was the first Tuesday of Lamta (Lamda). Even today, right from the era of King Senbi Kiyamba (1467-1508 AD), the Sarangthem family members organise a grand feast (Chaklen Katpa) in honor of the goddess every year. Later, Irai Leima came to be known as Hiyangthang Lairembi.

== Festival ==
Devotees believe that Goddess Hiyangthang Lairembi (alias Irai Leima) fulfills one's wish if asked for a blessing on the "boon day" at the right time. The boon day (Bor Numit) coincides with the third day of Hindu festival Durga Puja.
