= Loitang Khunou =

Loitang Khunou ꯂꯣꯢꯇꯥꯡ ꯈꯨꯅꯧ
- Village
- Location in Manipur, India Loitang Khunou (India)
- Coordinates: 24.8378°N 93.8765°E
- Country: India
- State: Manipur
- District: Imphal West
- Subdivision: Lamshang
- Gram panchayat: Phumlou gram panchayat

Area
  - Total: 483.97 ha (1,195.9 acres)
- Time zone: UTC+5:30 (IST)
- Postal code: 795002
- Area code: 270002

Loitang Khunou is a village in the Lamshang subdivision of Imphal West district of Manipur, India. It is governed by the Phumlou gram panchayat.

It has 228 families residing.

== Demographics ==
As per the 2011 census;

- Population: 1081 (550 males and 531 females).
- Sex ratio: 965 females per 1000 males.
- Children under 6: 114
- Children sex ratio: 869 females per 1000 males.
- Literacy rate: 86.87%

=== Caste Factor ===
There are 104 Scheduled Castes and 3 Scheduled Tribes in Loitang Khunou in total.

== Education ==
The Loitang Khunou P.S is a school established in the village in 1958. It consists of Grades I to Grade V. The school is Co-educational and it doesn't have a pre-primary section. It is approachable by all weather roads.

Additionally for education, Loitang Khunou has:

- A government pre-primary school and a private pre-primary school.
- A private primary school.
- A government middle school and a private middle school.
