= Koutruk =

Village in Lamshang, Imphal West, Manipur, India

Koutruk ꯀꯧꯇ꯭ꯔꯨꯛ
- Village
- Location in Manipur, India Koutruk (India)
- Coordinates: 24.756°N 93.956°E
- Country: India
- State: Manipur
- District: Imphal West
- Subdivision: Lamshang (Lamsang)

Area
  - Total: 2.4562 km^{2} (0.9483 sq mi)

Population (2011)
  - Total: 472
  - Density: 192/km^{2} (498/sq mi)
- Time zone: UTC+5:30 (IST)
- Postal code: 795146
- Vehicle registration: MN

Koutruk is a village in the Lamshang subdivision of the Imphal West district, in Manipur, India. It is administratively governed by the Phayeng gram panchayat.

== Demographics ==
As per the 2011 Census of India;

- The population was 472 with 225 males and 247 females There were 69 children under 6 (14.62 per cent).
- The child sex ratio was 865 females per 1000 males.
- The general literacy rate was 69.98 per cent; male was 77.13 per cent and female was 63.72 per cent, which was lower than the state average.

== Administration and politics ==
Koutruk is located in the Lamshang subdivision of Imphal West. It is within the Sekmai Assembly constituency of the Manipur Legislative Assembly and the Inner Manipur Lok Sabha constituency.

== Education ==
The Koutruk Primary School was established in 1957. This school is a government school and provides education from Class I to Class V and lies in the Haorang block of Imphal West. It is a co-educational school and has no pre-primary section.

As part of an extension programme for the school buildings, the Manipur Planning Department has taken up the work of reconstruction of the damaged building of the Koutruk Primary School for the year 2023-24.

== Postal and transport ==
- PIN Code: 795146.
- Imphal City: 18 kilometres away from Koutruk.
- Nearest railway station: Jiribam railway station.

== Incidents in the 2023-2024 conflict ==
Koutruk village has been one of the victims of the 2023-2025 Manipur violence. An air-attack was carried out by military drones with explosive and shooting on the evening of the 1st September, 2024. Many of the villagers had to evacuate from the village and civilian casualties and injuries occurred and houses were burnt. It was one of the first significant drone-bombing incidents during the conflict, according to numerous reports.

Strikes and air raids continued in the village Koutruk during the subsequent weeks with gunfire and air strikes causing further injuries and dislocation. As a result of the intensity of the attacks, the inquiry has been handed over to the National Investigation Agency (N.I.A). There was continuous sporadic violence till October, 2024. The neighbouring villages like Koutruk Ching Leikai were also affected. Koutruk, which was one of the most reported locations during the unrest, came to represent the conflict's escalation into drone warfare.
