= Hayel =

Hayel (Arabic: هايل) is an Arabic word which is used as both a masculine given name and a surname. In Tunisian Arabic it means "very good".

Notable people with the name include:

== Given name ==
=== First name ===
- Hayel Abdul Hamid (1937–1991), Palestinian Fatah member
- Hayel Daoud, Jordanian politician
- Hayel Saeed (1902–1990), Yemeni businessman

=== Middle name ===
- Saad Hayel Srour (born 1947), Jordanian politician.

== Surname ==
- Ahmad Hayel (1983), Jordanian football player and coach
