= Yumnam Jatra Singh =

Indian teacher

Yumnam Jatra Singh was an Indian exponent and teacher of Nata Sankirtana, a Vaishnavite performing tradition of Manipur combining devotional singing, percussion and dance.

Singh received the Manipur State Kala Akademi Award in 2013 and the Sangeet Natak Akademi Amrit Award in 2023. In 2026, he was posthumously awarded the Padma Shri in the field of art.

== Early life and training ==
Singh was born on 12 September 1923 at Tendongyan Awang Leikai in present-day Imphal West district, Manipur. He became involved in Nata Sankirtana at an early age and trained under practitioners of the tradition.

He later received formal training at the Jawaharlal Nehru Manipur Dance Academy (JNMDA), obtaining a diploma in Nat Eshei in 1976 and a diploma in Nat Cholom in 1980. Nat Eshei is associated with the vocal component of the tradition, while Cholom incorporates movement and percussion.

== Career ==
Singh's performing career began in 1949 and continued for more than seven decades. He performed Nata Sankirtana in Manipur and at cultural programmes elsewhere in India. His performances included appearances at festivals organised by the Manipur Sahitya Parishad, Manipur State Kala Akademi and Guru Gulapi Nat Sankirtan Academy. He also performed at events in Tripura and West Bengal, and participated in a Manipuri Nata Sankirtana programme in Delhi in 1960.

Singh later served as a visiting guru at the Jawaharlal Nehru Manipur Dance Academy, where he taught Nata Sankirtana. He was also an approved artist of All India Radio, Imphal, for Nat Eshei.

== Death ==
Singh died on 11 October 2025 at the age of 102. His Padma Shri was announced posthumously in January 2026.
