= Phayeng railway station =

Railway station in India

Coordinates: 24.821°N 93.818°E

Dholakhal

General information
- Location: Kangchup, Manipur; India
- Elevation: 785 metres (2,575 ft)
- System: Indian Railways station
- Owner: Indian Railways
- Operator: Northeast Frontier Railway
- Line: Jiribam–Imphal railway line
- Platforms: 1
- Tracks: 2

Construction
- Structure type: Standard (on-ground station)
- Parking: No
- Cycle facilities: No

Other information
- Status: Under-construction
- Station code: PHYNG
- Zone(s): Northeast Frontier Railway
- Division(s): Lumding

History
- Opened: TBA
Location

Phayeng railway station is a proposed railway station in Imphal West district, Manipur. Its code is PHYNG. It will serve Kangchup city. The proposed station includes two platforms. The work on this rail line is expected to be finished year 2019.
