= Samurou =

- Town
- Location in Manipur, India Samurou (India)
- Coordinates: 24.67272°N 93.93805°E
- Country: India
- State: Manipur
- District: Imphal West

Population (2001)
  - Total: 14,232

Languages
  - Official: Meiteilon (Manipuri)
- Time zone: UTC+5:30 (IST)
- Vehicle registration: MN
- Website: manipur.gov.in

Samurou is a town and a Municipal Council in Imphal West district in the Indian state of Manipur. The town is about 13 kilometres from Imphal via Mayai Lambi Road and is on the banks of Imphal River

== Demographics ==
As of 2001 India census, Samurou had a population of 14,232. Males constitute 50% of the population and females 50%. Samurou has an average literacy rate of 66%, higher than the national average of 59.5%: male literacy is 78%, and female literacy is 55%. In Samurou, 16% of the population is under 6 years of age.

== History ==
From the ancient times Samurou has been a noted place in the history of Kangleipak(Manipur). Chigong, one of the seven Maichous(scholars) of Kangleipak was born in Samurou. There is also a noted proverb which says "pena semmi ngeida Samurou youii" which means of loitering around doing only one work keeping the rest of the work aside. This proverb came into existence when Ibudhou Pakhangba (the first king of Manipur), who is also one of the gods, decided to safeguard Samurou. There are two beautiful temples for the deity of Ibudhou Pakhangba, one at Samurou Mayai Leikai and one at Samurou Makha Leikai.

== Achievements ==
Samurou is the birthplace of the famous Manipuri poet Hijam Angahal. Hijam Angahal wrote the famous epic of Manipur "Khamba Thoibi Seireng", and Ebemma(drama), Thambal(allegory) etc.

== Spots ==
Machu cinema, one of the finest cinema theater of Manipur is at Samurou. There is also another theater called Samurou Lakpa.

== School and Educational Centre ==
1. Maipakpi Memorial Academy, Samurou Awang Leikai
2. Brilliant Public School
3. Little Master Higher Secondary School
