= Patsoi =

Sub-district in Imphal West District of Manipur

Coordinates: 24.787°N 93.880°E

Patsoi is a tehsil (sub-district) in the Imphal West District of Manipur. The census code of Patsoi block is 01880. There are about 25 villages in Patsoi block, including the Patsoi village.

== List of villages in Patsoi ==
1. Awang Jiri
2. Changangei
3. Ghari
4. Heigrujam
5. Khaidem
6. Khumbong
7. Konthoujam
8. Lamjaotongba
9. Langjing
10. Langjing Achouba
11. Lanshonbi
12. Leingangpokpi
13. Maha Koireng
14. Manamyang
15. Meisnam Kangmong
16. Moidangpok Khullen
17. Moidangpok Khunou
18. Patsoi (village includes Patsoi part 1 to 4)
19. Sajirok
20. Sangaiprou Maning
21. Taobungkhok
22. Top Khabi
23. Yarou Bamdiar
24. Yarou Meitram
25. Yurembam

== Polling stations ==
The polling stations in Patsoi legislative constituency include:

Polling Number	Area Name
19/01	Patsoi A
19/02	Patsoi A
19/03	Patsoi B
19/04	Patsoi B
19/05	Takyel Kolom Leikai
19/06	Takyel Kolom Leikai
19/07	Takyel Khongbwal
19/08	Takyel Khongbal
19/09	Khumanthem Leikai
19/10	Sagolband Sapam Leirak
19/11	Sagolband Sapam Leirak
19/12	Bijoy Govinda (A)
19/13	Bijoy Govinda (A)
19/14	Lamjaotongba (A)
19/15	Lamjaotongba (A)
19/16	Sapam Leirak Nongmaithem Leirak
19/17	Bijoy Govinda (B)
19/18	Bijoy Govinda (B)
19/19	Lamjaotongba (B)
19/20	Lamjaotongba (B)
19/21	Lamjaotongba (C)
19/22	Lamjaotongba (C)
19/23	Langjing Heinoubok
19/24	Langjing
19/25	Sangaiprou
19/26	Sangaiprou
19/27	Sadokpam Leikai
19/28	Tabungkhok Makha Leikai
19/29	Tabungkhok Makha Leikai
19/30	Ghari
19/31	Ghari
19/32	Changangei (A)
19/33	Changangei (A)
19/34	Changangei (B)
19/35	Changangei (B)
19/36	Mayaikoibi

The MLAs include:

- 2002: Moirangthem Nabadwip (Communist Party of India)
- 2007: Sapam Kunjakeswor Singh (Independent)
- 2012: Akoijam Mirabai Devi (Indian National Congress)
