= Hayel Saeed Anam Group =

Multinational conglomerate

Hayel Saeed Anam & Co.
- Type: Conglomerate
- Industry: Cement, Agricultural Production and Processing, Wheat Flour manufacturing, Sugar refining, Fast Consumer Goods manufacturing, Dairy Products, Oil & Ghee, Tobacco, Plastic, Mineral Water, Trading, Construction, Oil & Mining, Real Estate development, Insurance, and Banking, Travel and Tourism, Hotels Biscuits, Confectionery Logistics
- Founded: 1938
- Founder: Hayel Saeed Anam
- Headquarters: UAE
- Number of locations: Saudi Arabia, the United Kingdom, Malaysia, Indonesia, Singapore, the United Arab Emirates, Egypt, Yemen, and Kenya
- Key people: Abduljabbar Hayel Saeed (Chairman of the Owners' Representatives Board, CEO); Dirhem Abdo Saeed Anam (Chairman of the Board); Shawki Hayel Saeed (Group COO); Nabil Hayel Saeed (Yemen Chairman); Muneer Ahmed Hayel Saeed (Egypt Chairman); Ibrahim Hayel Saeed (Saudi Arabia Chairman); s Fouad Hayel Saeed (Malaysia Chairman)
- Number of employees: 35,000
- Website: hsagroup.com

The Hayel Saeed Anam & Co. (Arabic: هائل سعيد أنعم وشركاه) is active in the Middle East, Africa, Europe, and South East Asia. The group is owned and managed by the Saeed Anam family. The group today has grown to own over 92 companies in various regions, including Yemen, Saudi Arabia, UAE, Malaysia, Indonesia, Egypt, United Kingdom, Kenya, and Nigeria.

== History ==
The history of the group dates back to 1938, when Hayel Saeed Anam and his brothers, Mohamed Saeed An'am, Abdu Saeed Anam, and Jazem Saeed Anam founded a retail store in Aden, Yemen. Five years later, they founded an import and export company based in Aden, which paved the way for their growing business. In 1950, they expanded their business in Northern Yemen through opening stores in Mocha, Taiz, Hudaydah and Aden and after 2 years the company was incorporated as Hayel Saeed Anam and Partners. The group extended their business through several regions. In 1977, they launched the starting point for investment in Europe by setting up the group's first trade and industrial company in the UK. In 1987, their business expanded even in the Arab region as they launched a National Biscuits and Confectionery Company in Saudi Arabia. Following the death of the founder Hayel Saeed Anam in 1990, the group continued his legacy by launching many more initiatives across different regions. In 1992, the group launched an establishment of cooking oil and ghee in Egypt. In 1999, HSA Group launched one of the biggest plants of oil refining in Indonesia. In 2006, the group established The General Trading of Agro commodities Midstar FZE in the UAE. In September 2024, HSA Group acquired a majority stake in the Egyptian food company Bisco-Misr from Kellanova.

== Reaction to the COVID-19 outbreak ==
The International Initiative on COVID-19 in Yemen (IICY) was founded, amongst others, by the charity arm of the HSA Group with the goal to improve the limited testing capabilities for the SARS-CoV-2 in Yemen. The IICY said in a statement that the first 34-tonne shipment contained 49,000 virus collection kits, 20,000 rapid test kits, five centrifuges and equipment that would enable 85,000 tests, and 24,000 COVID-19 nucleic acid test kits. The air-borne shipment arrived in Yemen on 19 June 2020.

== Food Security Partnerships ==
HSA Group leads several efforts to strengthen food security in their home country of Yemen, where more than 17 million people are estimated to not have enough food to eat. To support food security efforts, in 2021, the International Financial Corporation (IFC) made an investment that provides and mobilizes up to $75 million in debt financing for HSA operations in the country. The financing package includes a syndicated loan from FMO, the Dutch Entrepreneurial Development Bank, of up to $20 million. Over the last decade, HSA has also partnered with UN agencies, including the World Health Organization (WHO), the UN Office for Coordination of Humanitarian Affairs (UN OCHA) and the World Food Programme (WFP) on a variety of food security initiatives and aid programmes that benefit millions of Yemenis. Its work with the WFP has included milling flour for distribution across Yemen, manufacturing high-energy date bars for school feeding programmes and distributing emergency food baskets across Yemen. In 2023, HSA Group partnered with Tetra Pak on an initiative in Yemen that will serve as a pilot for introducing fortified milk in school feeding programmes. Results of the school milk program include higher child cognition scores, improved children's learning, improved household food security, and enhanced mental health among caregivers and children.
