= Naoriya Pakhanglakpa =

- Census town
- Location in Manipur, India Naoriya Pakhanglakpa (India)
- Coordinates: 24.785275°N 93.927940°E
- Country: India
- State: Manipur
- District: Imphal West

Population (2001)
  - Total: 6,619

Languages
  - Official: Meiteilon (Manipuri)
- Time zone: UTC+5:30 (IST)
- Vehicle registration: MN
- Website: manipur.gov.in

Naoriya Pakhanglakpa is a census town in Imphal West district in the Indian state of Manipur.

== Demographics ==
As of 2001 India census, Naoriya Pakhanglakpa had a population of 6619. Males constitute 50% of the population and females 50%. Naoriya Pakhanglakpa has an average literacy rate of 79%, higher than the national average of 59.5%: male literacy is 85%, and female literacy is 73%. In Naoriya Pakhanglakpa, 10% of the population is under 6 years of age.

== Politics ==
Naoriya Pakhanglakpa is part of Inner Manipur (Lok Sabha constituency).
