= Hiyangthang =

- Town
- Location in Manipur, India Hiyangthang (India)
- Coordinates: 24°43′5″N 93°54′2″E
- Country: India
- State: Manipur
- District: Imphal West

Population (2011)
  - Total: 4,778
- Time zone: UTC+5:30 (IST)
- PIN: 795009

Hiyangthang is a town in the Indian state of Manipur. It is best known for the Hiyangthang Lairembi Temple, a Meitei shrine dedicated to the ancient Meitei goddess Irai Leima (also known as Hiyangthang Lairembi). It is located in the Imphal West district of Manipur. The Hiyangthang village has a population of 4,778 according to the 2011 Census of India.

== In folklore ==
The legend of ancient Meitei goddess Irai Leima (later known as Hiyangthang Lairembi) and her dedicated shrine Hiyangthang Lairembi Temple revolves around the region of Hiyangthang. In the legend, she was an exceptionally beautiful princess of Heibok Ching (Meitei for 'Heibok mountains'). King Heibok Ningthou, her father, was a master of wizards and black magicians. One day, King Kwakpa (Kokpa) of Khuman dynasty saw Irai Leima fishing and playing in the Liwa river. He fell in love at first sight with her beauty. He proposed her. However, she told him that her parents' wish will be her wish. So, King Kwakpa and his subjects gave beautiful and precious gifts to King Ningthou to please him. King Kwakpa decided to marry Irai Leima whether her father reject or accept the gifts. Seeing the immodesty of King Khuman Kwakpa, King Ningthou rejected all the presents and turned then into stones using his magic. King Kwakpa returned home disappointed.

One day, King Kwakpa got drunk with a juice of the roots of Tera plant (Bombax malabaricum) and went in a Hiyang boat to meet Irai Leima. Seeing him coming, Irai Leima fled to Pakhra Ching (Meitei for 'Pakhra mountains'). King Kwakpa chased her. Seeing all these, King Ningthou turned the Hiyang boat into stone and the oar into a tree using his magic. Getting furious, Kwakpa tried to kill Ningthou, which forced Ningthou to turn Kwakpa into stone as well. Irai Leima was frightened seeing everything and ran away from her own father, passing through the Pakhra Ching, crossing through the Liwa river and hiding herself inside the granary storehouse of Lord Sarangthem Luwangba of Luwang dynasty. When Lord Luwangba and his good lady Thoidingjam Chanu Amurei left the house for paddy fields, Irai Leima came out from her hideout and completed all the household works for them. Before the couple returned home, she went back to her hideout again. The couple were surprised at this but it happened daily. So, one day, the man returned home earlier than normal timing and discovered the truth behind the mystery. But when he came near Irai Leima, she was gone below the grain storehouse. He saw nothing under the granary. He was confused at this. So, he discussed the matter with his clan members, searching for her everywhere but not finding her anymore.

Irai Leima came to the dream of Lord Sarangthem Luwangba and told him that she merged herself into the Luwang clan and spiritually became his daughter. Luwangba narrated his dream's story to King Senbi Kiyamba of Ningthouja dynasty. The Ningthouja King sent maibas and maibis, who performed investigations and finally verified that the strange lady was a goddess and she should be worshipped. King Kiyaamba ordered Luwangba to worship her. From that year onwards, princess Irai Leima was deified and worshipped as a Meitei goddess.

The first day on which Luwangba saw Irai Leima was the first Monday of the Meitei lunar month of Lamta (Lamda). And the day on which the maibas and maibis examine the case was the first Tuesday of Lamta (Lamda), the next day. Still in present times, right from the reign of King Senbi Kiyamba (1467-1508 AD), the Sarangthem family members of Luwang clan annually organise a grand feast (Meitei: Chaklen Katpa) in honor of goddess Irai Leima.
