= Thongkhong Laxmi Bazar =

- Town
- Location in Manipur, India Thongkhong Laxmi Bazar (India)
- Coordinates: 24.63386°N 93.90156°E
- Country: India
- State: Manipur
- District: Imphal West

Population (2001)
  - Total: 12,779

Languages
  - Official: Meitei
- Time zone: UTC+5:30 (IST)
- Postal code: 795009
- Vehicle registration: MN
- Website: manipur.gov.in

Thongkhong Laxmi Bazar is a town and a nagar panchayat in Imphal West district in the Indian state of Manipur.

== Demographics ==
As of 2001 India census, Thongkhong Laxmi Bazar had a population of 12,779. Males constitute 50% of the population and females 50%. Thongkhong Laxmi Bazar has an average literacy rate of 58%, lower than the national average of 59.5%: male literacy is 69%, and female literacy is 46%. In Thongkhong Laxmi Bazar, 16% of the population is under 6 years of age.
