= Indira Gandhi Rashtriya Manav Sangrahalaya =

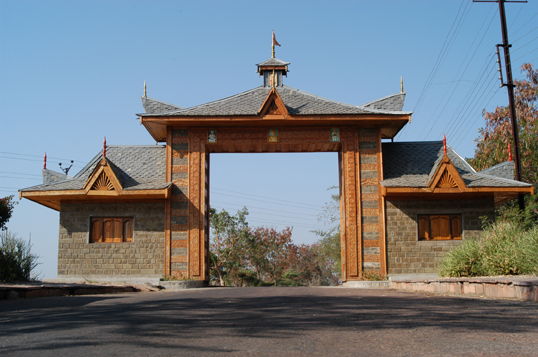
- Indira Gandhi Rashtriya Manav Sangrahalaya
- Former name: National Museum of Mankind
- Established: 21 March 1977; 49 years ago
- Location: Shymala Hills, Bhopal, Madhya Pradesh 462013
- Coordinates: 23.232279°N 77.37761°E
- Type: Anthropological museum
- Director: Prof. Amitabh Pande
- Website: www.igrms.gov.in

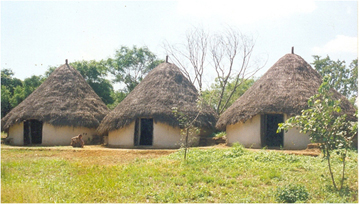
Rabari house

Indira Gandhi Rashtriya Manav Sangrahalaya also referred to as the National Museum of Humankind, or Museum of Man and Culture is a museum located in Bhopal, Madhya Pradesh, India. The museum spreads over an area of about 200 acres on the Shymala Hills in the city. This museum depicts the story of mankind in time and space. It is the largest ethnographic museum in India.

Located on Bhopal's upper lake, 'Rashtriya Manav Sangrahalaya' can be accessed either from Lake View Road or from another road near Demonstration School. IGRMS has a few permanent exhibitions, broadly categorised as open exhibitions, indoor galleries (Veethi-Sankul and Bhopal Gallery), and periodical/temporary exhibitions. It also has other presentations categorised under online exhibitions, travelling exhibitions, special exhibitions, and ongoing exhibitions.

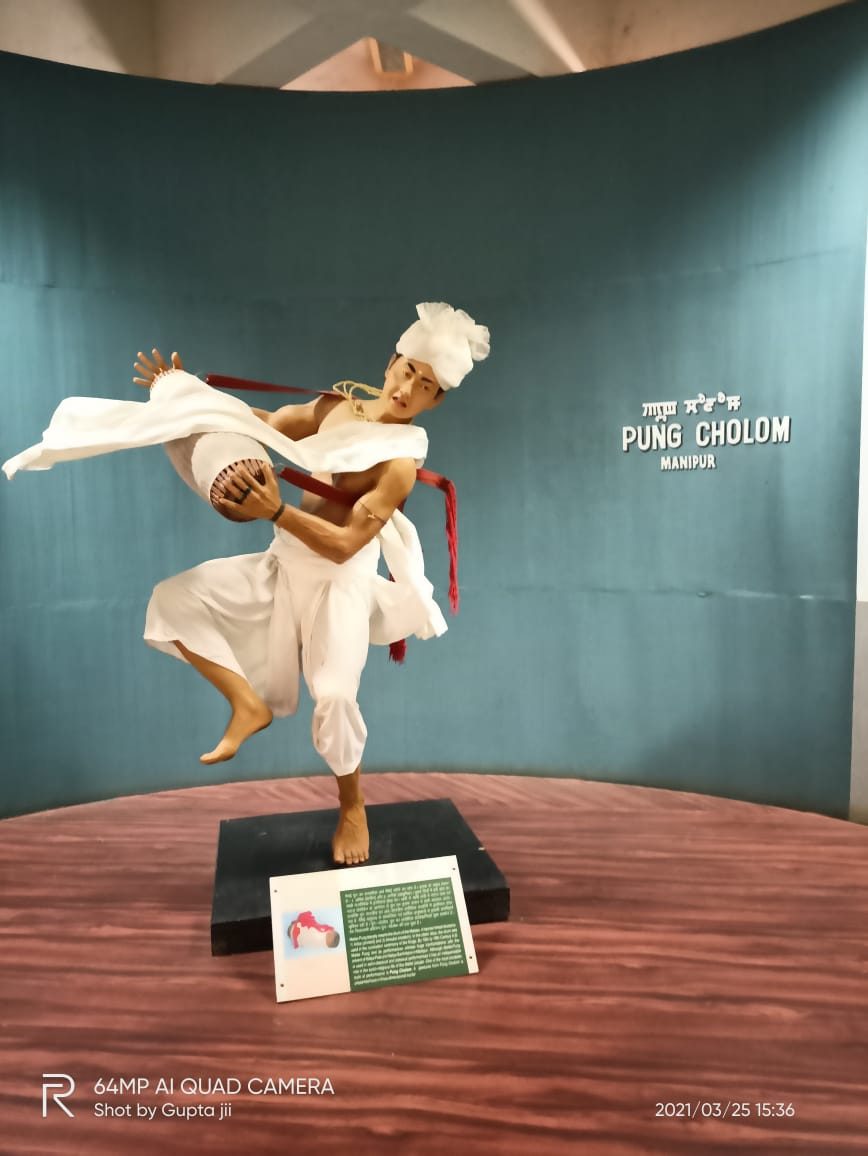
Manipur Cultural Dance Statue inside the museum

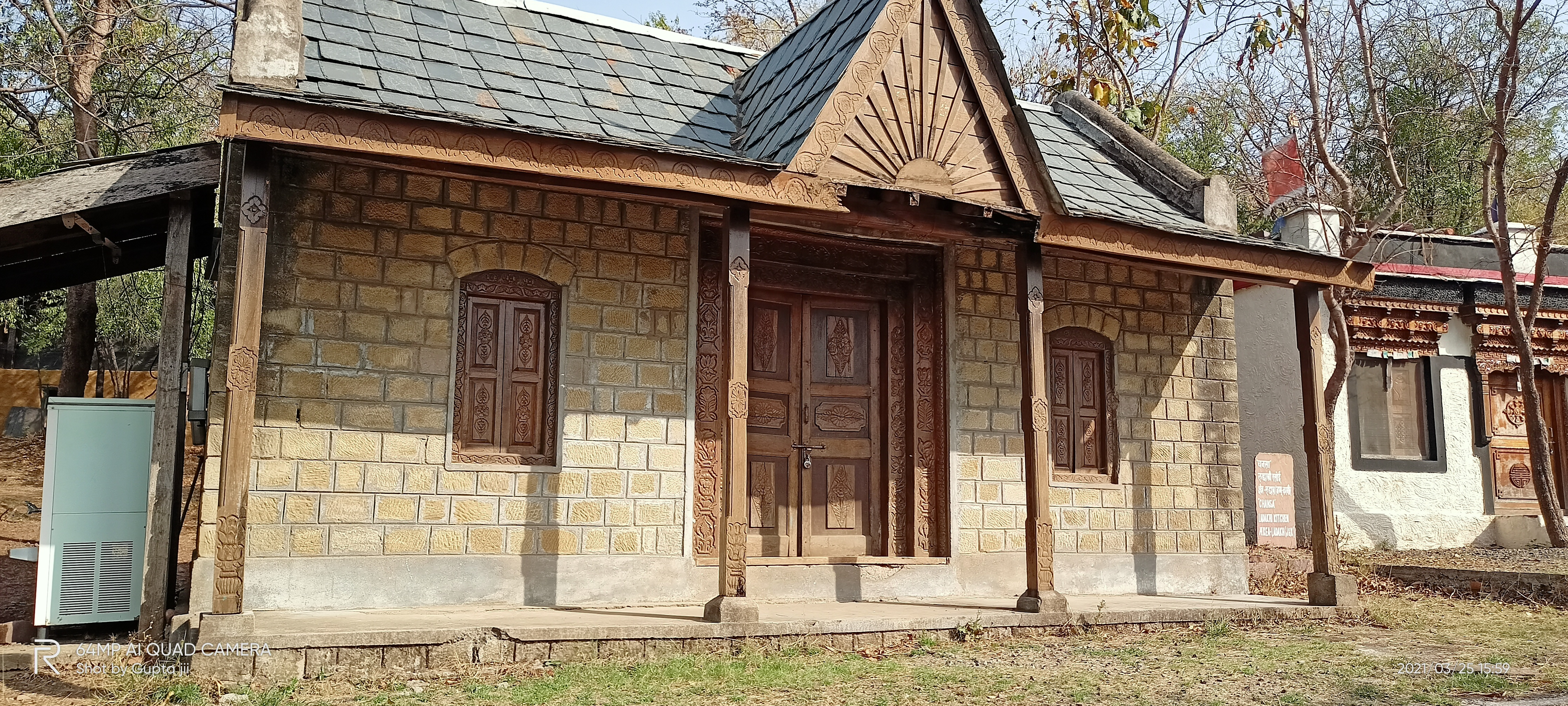

The museum has built the following open-air exhibitions: Tribal Habitat, Coastal Village, Desert Village, Himalayan Village, Rock Art Heritage, Mythological Trail, River Valley Culture, Aiyyanar Shrine Complex, and Traditional Technology Park.

The museum also has a regional centre for the South India region, located at Mysore in Karnataka.

== History ==
In 1970, as part of an Indian Science Congress session held in Calcutta, "Sachin Roy, President of Anthropology and Archaeology section, in his presidential address, emphasised the need for a ‘Museum of Man’ in the country". It was then the Madhya Pradesh State Government offered 200 acres of land and consequently the museum was formally established in the state and then inaugurated on 21 April 1979 by union minister Dr Pratap Chandra Chunder. Initially, the museum was located at the Bahawalpur House, New Delhi.

Alongside exhibiting material culture and intangible heritage presentations at the museum, the Indira Gandhi Rashtriya Manav Sangrahalaya has also preserved and presented diverse forms of natural features, landscapes, and ecosystems that hold significant value in terms of their cultural, scientific, aesthetic, or ecological importance. According to Kalyan Kumar Chakravarty, formerly director (1994–2000) of the IGRMS and member secretary (2004–2009) of the Indira Gandhi National Centre for the Arts, "the museum at Bhopal does not consider the past alone as its preserve, the Indian tribal or prehistoric man as its only concern, or the indigenous traditional knowledge systems as the only areas of its investigation because it has concerned itself seriously with issues of scientific research and investigation, with a bearing on community well being, with different areas of ethno-sciences, with interface between contemporary and traditional architecture, with urban and country planning, in and ex situ preservation of germ-plasm in minor forest timber produce, viable patterns of water and physical resource sharing and their impact on cultural patterns in the Himalayan system, and, with measures to deal with ecological degradation".

== Galleries ==
The indoor museum consists of twelve galleries.

1. Human Bio-Cultural Evolution
2. Human Odyssey
3. Lingo Yatra (Festival of the Koitor)
4. Mandwa Gohri (Bhil-Rathwa Ritual exhibits)
5. Ethnic Art
6. Belief-system, Cosmology, and Rituals Arts
7. Ethno-musical Gallery
8. Masks
9. Ethnic Cuisine and Folk Art Traditions
10. Visual Storage and Research Gallery
11. Culture of the North-East India
12. Island treasures of India

== Exhibited artworks ==
- Khambana Kao Phaba (painting) – from Manipur
- Poubi Lai (sculpture) – from Manipur
- Replica of the Kangla Gate – from Manipur
