= Leiphrakpam =

Village in India

Coordinates: 24.669413°N 93.913896°E

Leiphrakpam is a village in Manipur, India. Imphal River runs through the middle of the village.

One half of the village comes under Thoubal District and the other half comes under Imphal West District. The near post office is Wangoi Post Office. The pin code is 795009.
