= National Sports University =

Central university in India with specialization in sports

- Type: Central University
- Established: 2018; 8 years ago
- Affiliations: UGC
- Budget: ₹63.72 crore (US$6.6 million) (2025–26)
- Vice-Chancellor: Daljit Singh Chaudhary, IPS (Retd.)
- Visitor: President of India
- Location: Imphal, Manipur, India
- Website: www.nsu.ac.in

National Sports University is a central university, located in Manipur, India with specialization in sports. The designated location is near the village of Koutruk in the Imphal West district. It is currently operating from a temporary campus in Imphal.

Prime Minister Narendra Modi has laid foundation stone for National Sports University on 16 March 2018. Courses offered are Bachelor of Physical Education & Sports, B.Sc., M.Sc. and M.A.
