= Hayel Saeed =

Yemeni businessman

Hayel Saeed Anam
- Born: 1902; Taiz, Yemen Vilayet
- Died: April 23, 1990; Taiz, Yemen Arab Republic
- Occupations: Businessman and philanthropist

Hayel Saeed Anam (Arabic: هائل سعيد أنعم) (1902 – 23 April 1990) was a Yemeni businessman and the founder of Hayel Saeed Anam Group.. His group is fully owned by his family and runs over 92 companies around the world, spread across various geographies: Yemen, Saudi Arabia, UAE, Malaysia, Indonesia, Egypt, the United Kingdom, Kenya, and Nigeria. He retired from the executive role in the business in 1970 to fully run the social welfare foundation he had founded. He died on April 23, 1990.

== Values ==
The values instilled in Hayel Saeed Anam and his brothers by their late father, Saeed Anam, contributed to their success. Their success was primarily driven by the virtues of integrity, honesty, trust, generosity, continuous charity, and the love of goodness. In addition to valuing education, Hayel Saeed sought to end illiteracy by helping to improve the educational attainment of his nation's citizens.

== His Life ==
He was born in the village of Qaradh - Arouk - Hujaryyah - Taiz Governorate, Yemen. He was the third of four sons: Mohamed Saeed Anam, Abdu Saeed Anam, Hayel Saeed Anam, and Jazem Saeed Anam. At the beginning of his life, he worked sewing clothes and selling what he made. In 1915, he left his village, Qaradh, heading towards the city of Aden. He immigrated to France, where he stayed for almost ten years. After being soutier then worker in an oil mill, he started a small business during his stay in France, where he got positive feedback on his integrity, skills, and quality of his trade that remained unforgettable throughout his life.

He then returned to Aden to start a small business with his brothers, which was a small grocery store in the district of Mualla, Aden. After he was forced to leave Aden by the communist party, which seized all his assets and business, the company expanded significantly in Taiz. During the 1970s, he opened the first private sector factory in the country, followed by other international expansion to the GCC and UK in the late 70's. The 80s witnessed the expansion to Southeast Asia and Egypt, which witnessed the group's venture into the edible oil industry.
