= Lamjaotongba =

- Census town
- Location in Manipur, India Lamjaotongba (India)
- Coordinates: 24.792394°N 93.91544°E
- Country: India
- State: Manipur
- District: Imphal West

Population (2001)
  - Total: 9,067

Languages
  - Official: Meeteilon (Manipuri)
- Time zone: UTC+5:30 (IST)
- Vehicle registration: MN
- Website: manipur.gov.in

Lamjaotongba is a census town in Imphal West district in the Indian state of Manipur.

== Demographics ==
As of 2011 India census, Lamjaotongba had a population of 10,593. Males constitute 48% of the population and females 52%. Lamjaotongba has an average literacy rate of 74%, higher than the national average of 59.5%: male literacy is 81%, and female literacy is 68%. In Lamjaotongba, 11% of the population is under 6 years of age.
