= Poubi Lai =

Mythical dragon in Meitei mythology

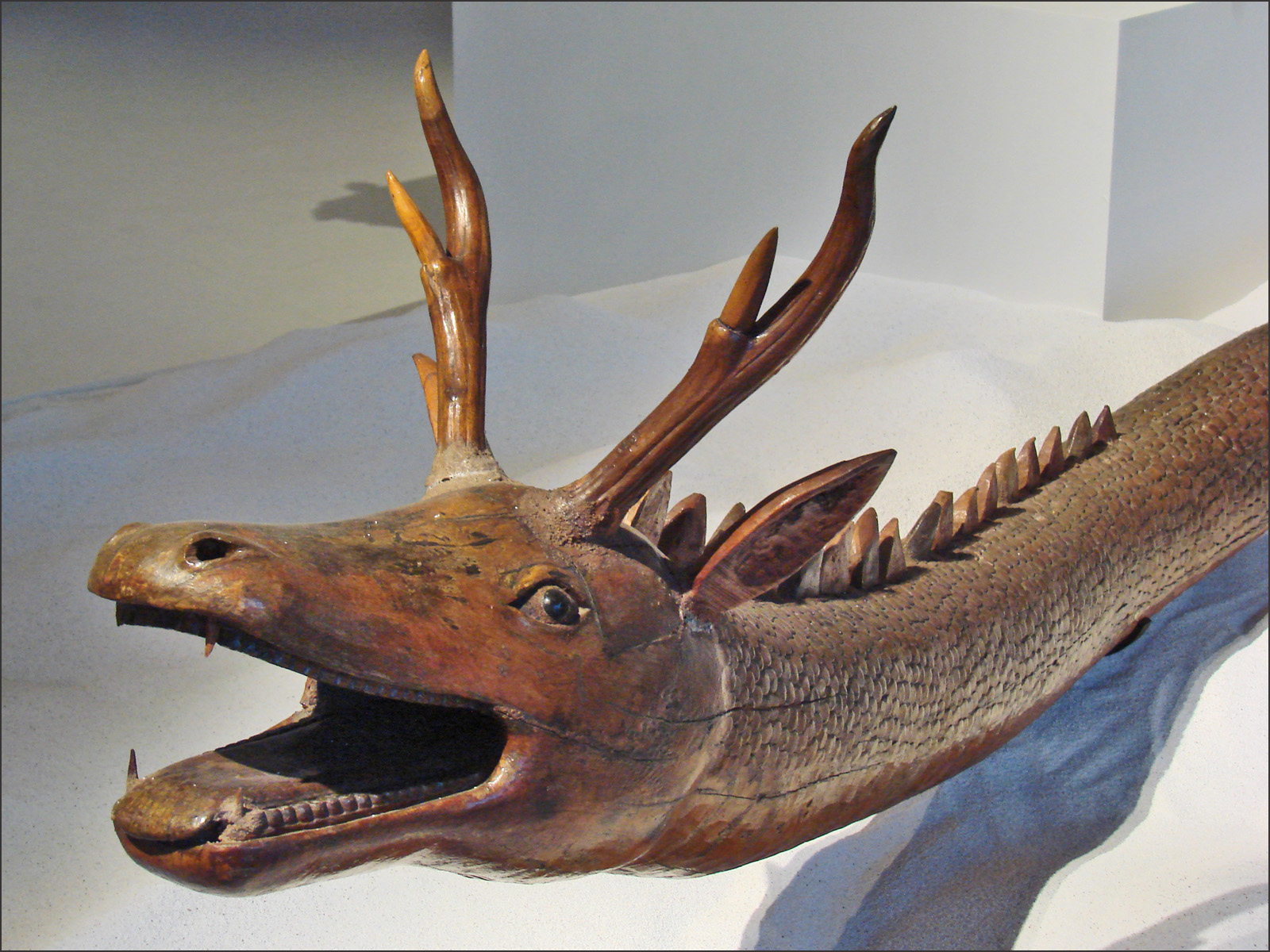
- Sculpture of Poubi Lai, displayed in the Quai Branly Museum, Paris, France in 2010.

Creature information
- Grouping: Legendary creatures
- Sub grouping: Dragon
- Similar entities: Pakhangba, Nongshaba, Qilin, Chimera, Pixiu, Kangla Sha, Uchek Langmeidong, Lai Khutshangbi, Keibu Keioiba
- Folklore: Meitei mythology (Manipuri mythology), Meitei folklore (Manipuri folklore)

Origin
- Country: Ancient Manipur (historical); India (present)
- Region: Manipur
- Habitat: Loktak lake

Poubi Lai was an ancient dragon python, who dwelled in the Loktak Lake of Manipur, in Meitei mythology and folklore. It is also referred to as "Loch Ness Monster of Manipur".

== Mythology ==
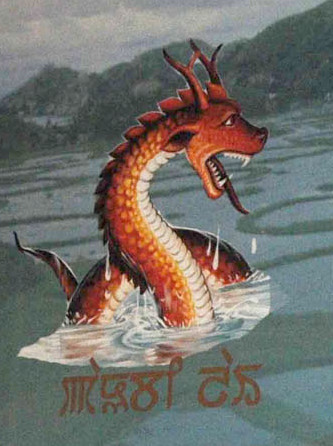
An illustration of Poubi Lai

In the Loktak lake, the spirit of Poubi Lai was awakened by the fishing activities of the fishermen of Moirang. Being angered, Poubi Lai destroyed many human habitats and killed many people. It decided to destroy the whole Moirang kingdom. He threatened the King of Ancient Moirang to offer him one Shangbai (basket) of rice and one human every day. The circumstance was sorrowful for the people of Moirang. Every household had to provide the offer turn by turn. When it was the turn of a young man, the lad sought help from Kabui Salang Maiba (or "Kabui Tomba"). The maiba was a shaman priest king of Kabui tribe in the Salangthel hill range of the Loktak lake. He promised to save the kingdom from the gigantic evil creature. He transformed a Tou plant (an aquatic plant) (or a Khok Waa bamboo plant in another version) into a powerful "Long" (a 9 pointed javelin). Later, the maiba slayed Poubi Lai with the deadly weapon.

In another version of the story, Poubi Lai (Paobirai) lives in the isle of the Karang Hill in the Loktak lake. It hunted the fishermen of Moirang coming to the lake and devoured them. It even attacked human settlement and hunted for its prey.

== Text ==
Poubi Lai (Paobirai) is mentioned in the ancient Meitei manuscript called the "Khongul Lirakpa".

== In popular culture ==
In 2002, Karam Dineshwar, an artisan had a dream. In his dream, Poubi Lai asked him to craft its image. In the next day, he came across a big tree root at Leimatak. He completed making the 21 feet long wooden sculpture of Poubi Lai in the next 6 months.

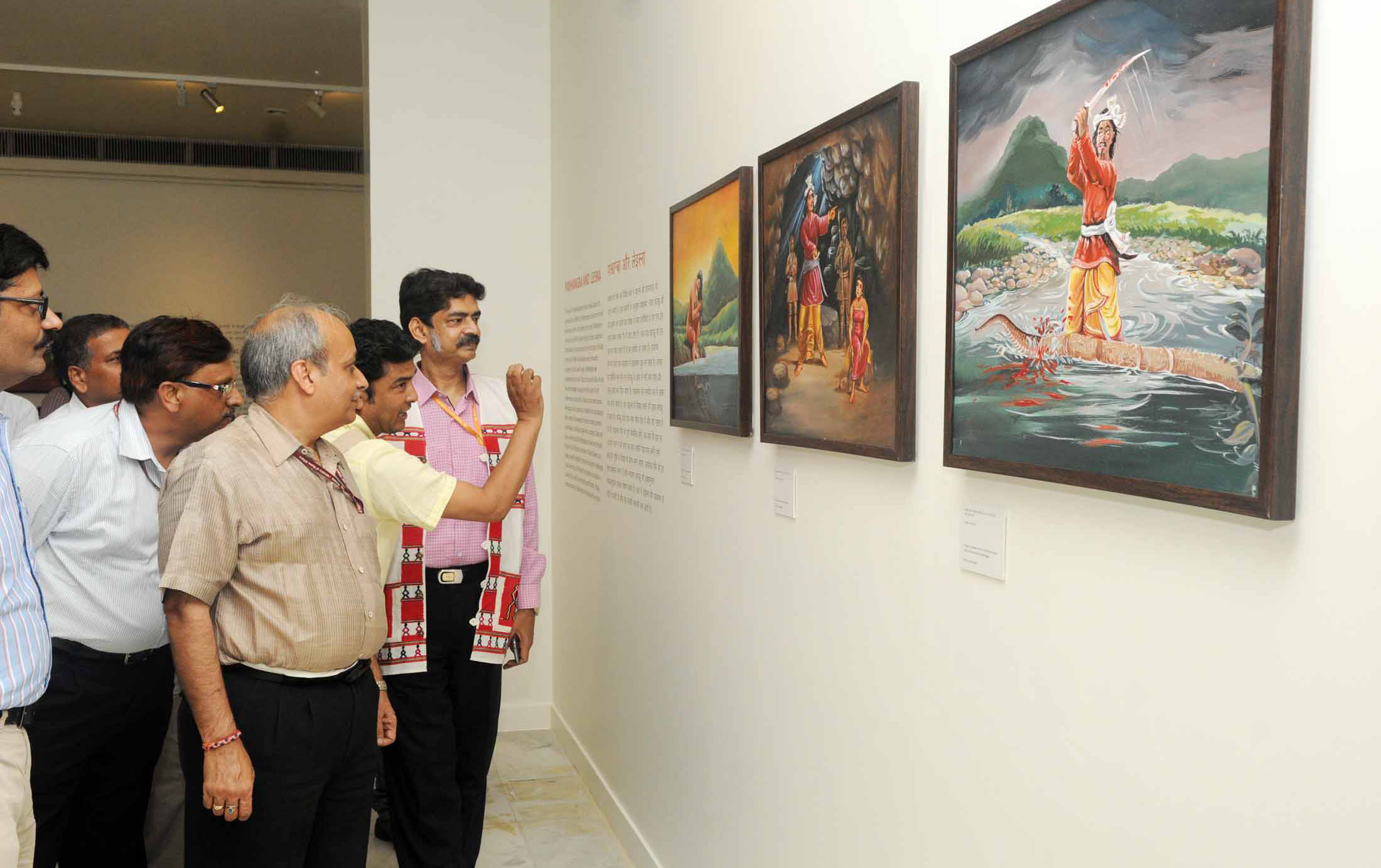
The Additional Secretary, Ministry of Culture, Shri K.K. Mittal, visits after inaugurating the 'Poubi Lai-The Story of a Giant Python', Single object exhibition mounted by the Indira Gandhi Rashtriya Manav Sangrahalaya (IGRMS), Bhopal in collaboration with National Museum, New Delhi on July 21, 2015.

The artwork of Poubi Lai was first exhibited in the Manipur State Museum, Manipur in 2002. Next, it was exhibited in the National Museum, New Delhi and later in the Quai Branly Museum, Paris, France in 2010. It was also received by the Indian Museum, Kolkata, the largest in India.

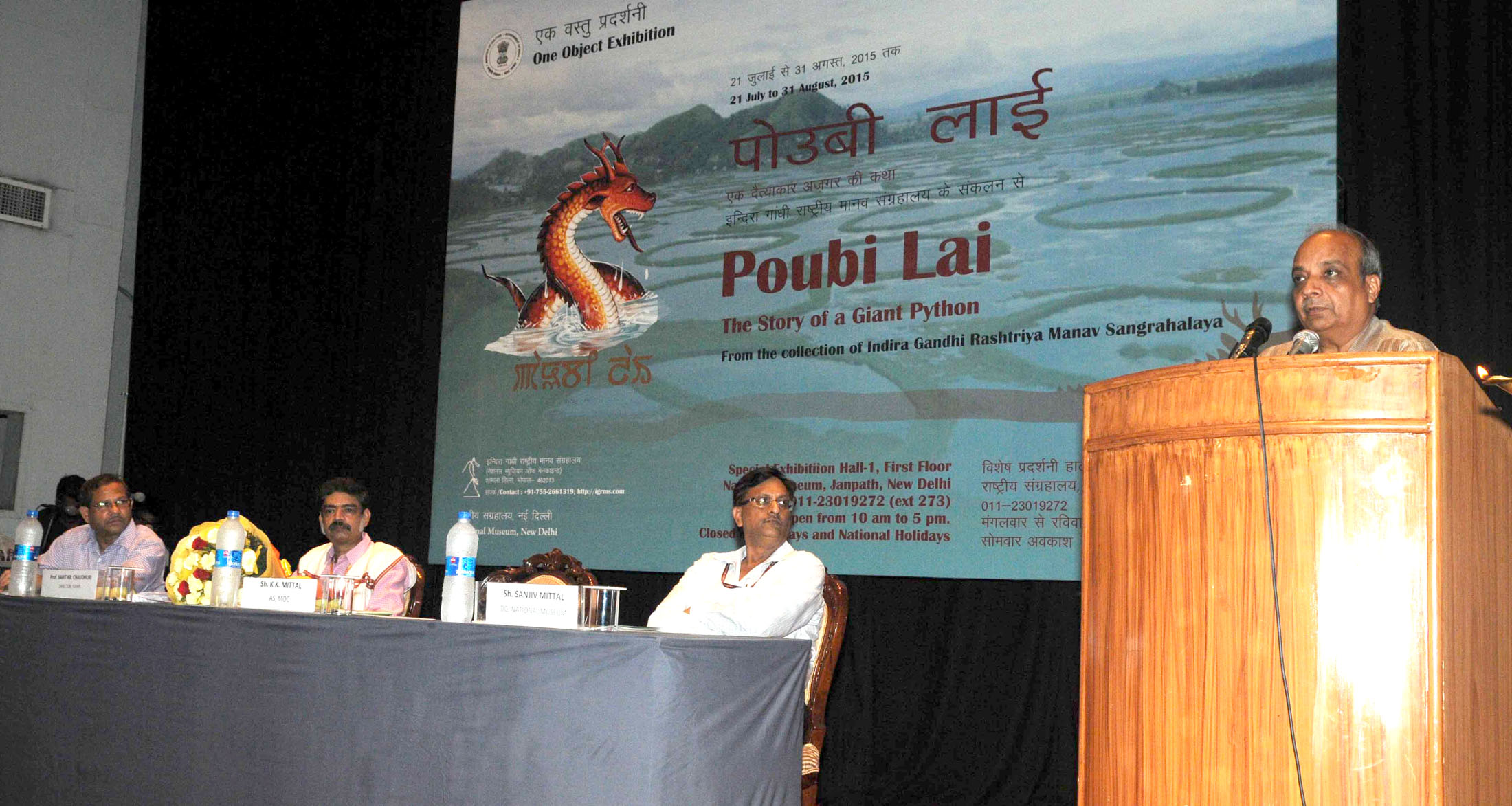
The Additional Secretary, Ministry of Culture, Shri K.K. Mittal, addressing at the inauguration of the 'Poubi Lai-The Story of a Giant Python', Single object exhibition mounted by the Indira Gandhi Rashtriya Manav Sangrahalaya (IGRMS), Bhopal in collaboration with National Museum, New Delhi on July 21, 2015.

In 2015, the National Museum, New Delhi organized an exhibition of the wooden sculpture of Poubi Lai for 42 days. The carving belongs to the permanent collection of the Indira Gandhi Rashtriya Manav Sangrahalaya (IGRMS), Bhopal. The object was declared as an "Object of National Importance". It was registered under "AA" Category of the Museum Collections.

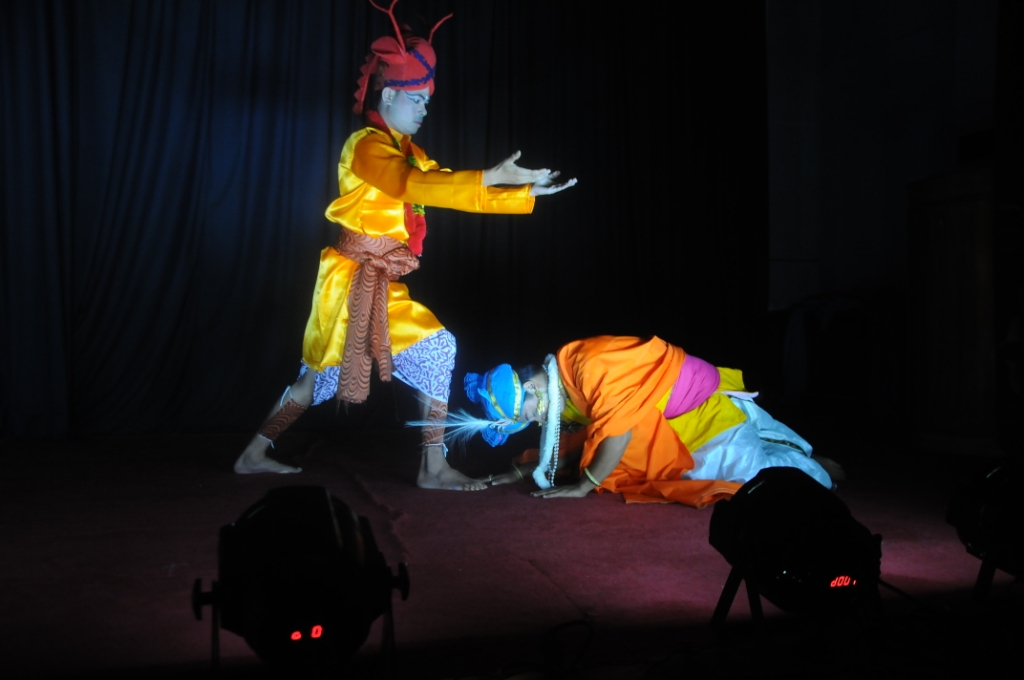
Artists performing a dance drama on the story of Poubi Lai in 2015

During the exhibition at Bhopal, 25 artists of Centre for Youth and Cultural Activities from Imphal, performed a dance drama on the story of Poubi Lai.

== See also ==
- Indira Gandhi Rashtriya Manav Sangrahalaya
- Loktak Folklore Museum
- Manipur State Museum
- National Museum, New Delhi
- Quai Branly Museum
