= Lilong (Imphal West) =

Lilong (Imphal West) Lilong Chajing
- Town
- Location in Manipur, India Lilong (Imphal West) (India)
- Coordinates: 24.7210°N 93.9397°E
- Country: India
- State: Manipur
- District: Imphal West

Population (2011)
  - Total: 12,427

Languages
  - Official: Meiteilon (Manipuri) (English)
- Time zone: UTC+5:30 (IST)
- Vehicle registration: MN
- Website: manipur.gov.in

Lilong (Imphal West), also called Lilong Chajing, is a town under a nagar panchayat (municipality) in Imphal West district in the Indian state of Manipur.

== Demographics ==
As of 2011 India census, Lilong (Imphal West) had a population of 12,427. Males constitute 49% of the population and females 51%. It has an average literacy rate of 77%, higher than the national average of 59.5%: male literacy is 83%, and female literacy is 71%. Of the town's population, 12% is under 6 years of age.
