= Sekmai =

Village in India

Sekmai is a village in the Imphal West district in the Indian state of Manipur. It is in the Lamsang sub-division of the district.

The village is known for the traditional rice liquor called Sekmai Yu, which is produced by local communities and holds cultural importance in Manipur.

== See also ==
- Phayeng
