= Sekmai Bazar =

Sekmai Bazar Sengmai Bazar
- Town
- Location in Manipur, India Sekmai Bazar (India)
- Coordinates: 24.94592°N 93.87647°E
- Country: India
- State: Manipur
- District: Imphal West

Population (2001)
  - Total: 4,325

Languages
  - Official: Sengmai(lai) (Manipuri)
- Time zone: UTC+5:30 (IST)
- Postal code: 795136
- Vehicle registration: MN
- Website: manipur.gov.in

Sekmai Bazar is a town and a municipal council in Imphal West district in the Indian state of Manipur.

== Demographics ==
As of 2001 India census, Sekmai Bazar had a population of 4325. Males constitute 50% of the population and females 50%. Sekmai Bazar has an average literacy rate of 66%, higher than the national average of 59.5%: male literacy is 72%, and female literacy is 59%. In Sekmai Bazar, 14% of the population is under 6 years of age.

== Politics ==
Sekmai is part of Inner Manipur (Lok Sabha constituency).
