= Phayeng =

Phayeng ꯆꯛꯄ ꯐꯌꯦꯡ Chakpa Phayeng
- Village
- Location in Manipur, India Phayeng (India)
- Coordinates: 24.84581°N 93.81665°E
- Country: India
- State: Manipur
- District: Imphal West

Languages
  - Official: Meiteilon (Manipuri)
- Time zone: UTC+5:30 (IST)
- PIN: 795146
- Vehicle registration: MN
- Nearest city: Imphal
- Lok Sabha Sekmai constituency: Inner Manipur
- Vidhan Sabha constituency: Sekmai
- Website: manipur.gov.in

Phayeng or Chakpa Phayeng is a large village located in the Lamshang division of Imphal West district, Manipur, India. It is located near the foothill of the Kangchup hill ranges.

It is a village in Manipur known for its history, cultural heritage, traditions, and relationship with nature.

== Postal and demographics ==
- PIN Code: 795146.

As per the 2011 census:

- Population: 2728 (1334 males and 1394 females).
- Children under 6: 364 (13.34% of the total population).
- Child sex ratio: 829 girls to 1000 boys.
- Average sex ratio: 1063 females per 1000 males.
- Literacy rate: 75.15%; male literacy was 83.88% while female literacy rate was 67.13%.

== Intangible cultural heritage ==
=== Death rites of Phayeng ===
The Chapka Phayeng people of Manipur are a part of the Meitei people itself. But they have a unique culture of burying the dead. Shikaplon is a tradition of “requiem and a funeral march”, along with Khousaba (Meitei: ꯈꯧꯁꯥꯕꯥ, lit. 'Martial movement'). According to their beliefs, in the afterlife, people go to the Khamnung Sawa (Meitei: ꯈꯝꯅꯨꯡ ꯁꯋꯥ, lit. 'Underworld') to unite with their ancestors. Among the mourning people during the time of burial, one of them should sing the Shikaplon, which gives instructions to the journey of the dead person to the underworld. The pena (musical instrument) should be played by the singer while singing the Shikaplon.

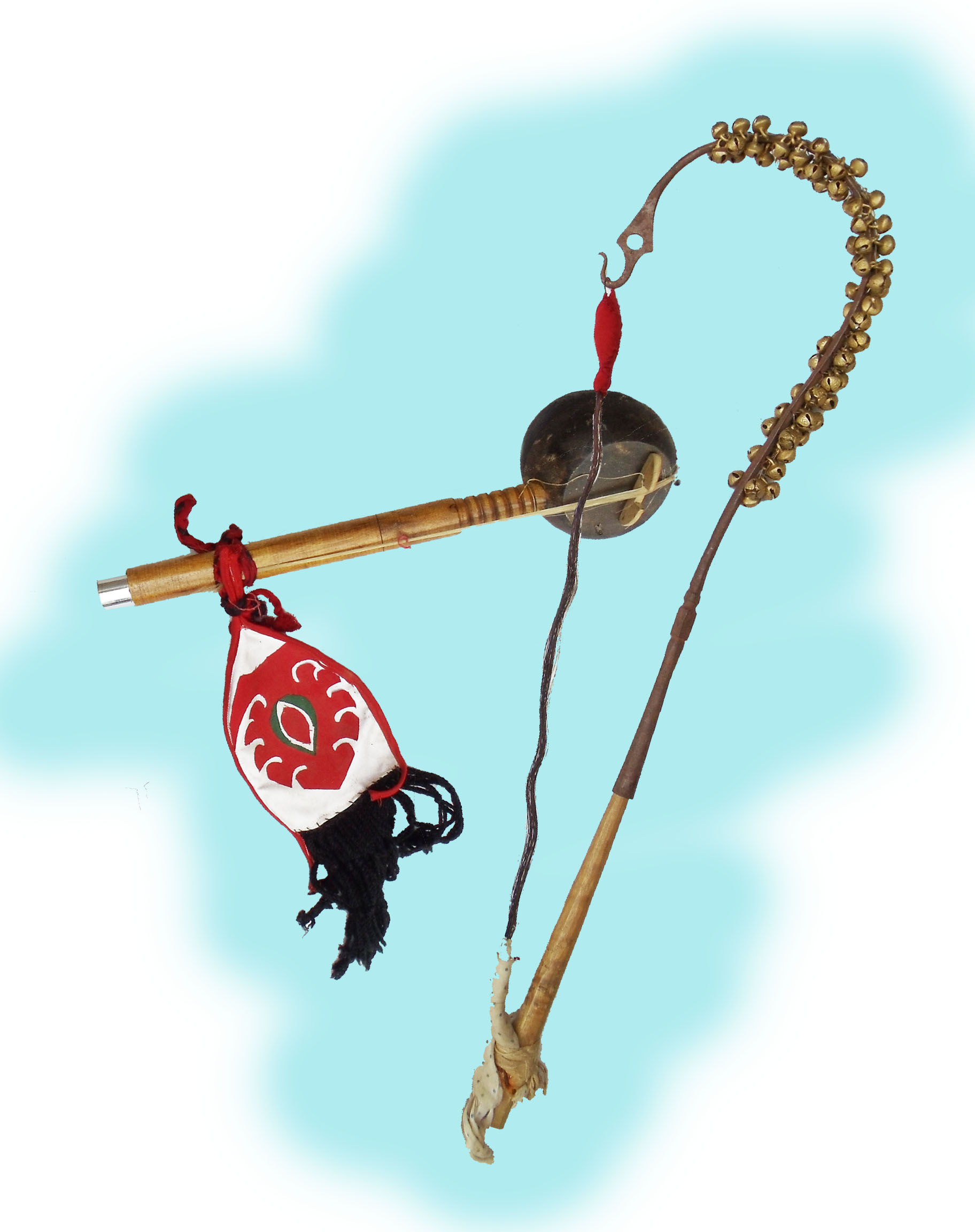
Pena (musical instrument) is used in the burial ritual ceremony of the Chakpa Phayeng people.

Another funeral tradition is the accompanying of a very rare martial art form known as Yenpha Khousa. Yenpha Khousa is a form of Ta Khousaba. It is performed by a young, close relative of the departed. It is performed with spear and shield.

== India's first carbon-positive settlement ==
Phayeng Village of Manipur has been tagged as the India's first carbon-positive settlement. As part of the carbon-positive village project, Phayeng will receive a grant of Rs10 crore in phases to facilitate afforestation in the catchment of river Maklang that flows along the village. The fund will also be utilised for creation of water bodies, introduction of climate change-resilient varieties of crops, installing solar lights, for setting up a community piggery and poultry farm, an eco-resort, replacing firewood in kitchen with cooking stoves and an indigenous knowledge centre in the village.

A village is given the Carbon-Positive Tag if it sequesters more carbon than it emits, slowing the accumulation of greenhouse gases and mitigating the effects of climate change. Phayeng is a scheduled caste village of the Chakpa community in Imphal West district and its conservation efforts are mainly linked to the belief that the forest is a sacred grove. It is surrounded by three densely forested hillocks with fruit trees at centre and a stream.

=== Environment friendly Community ===
"We had no tree on these hills earlier. Our fathers had deforested them because of timber-related disputes. But villagers started realising that the area had become extremely warm; there was no water and people were falling ill. So villagers decided that the forest should be rejuvenated at any cost. Our umang kanba (forest protection committee) came up with various rules and involved all 660 families in the village in recreating the forest,” said Angom Gojendra, former village chief and a forest committee member."
