= Kalyan Kumar Chakravarty =

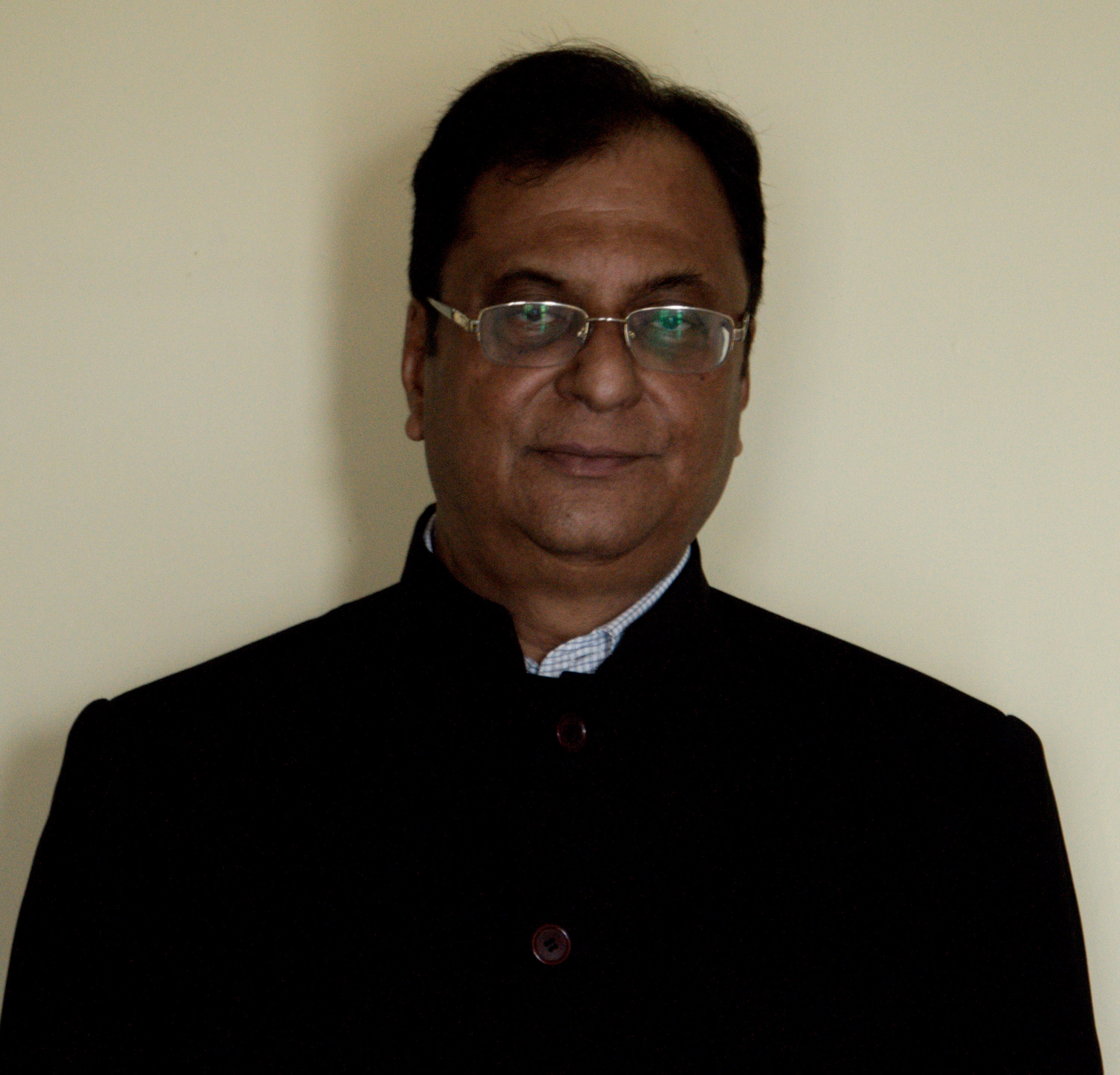
- Kalyan Kumar Chakravarty
- Born: 2 September 1947 (age 78); West Bengal
- Other name: K.K. Chakravarty
- Education: Presidency College, Calcutta, Calcutta University, Harvard University
- Occupations: IAS (Retired), Art Historian & Educationist
- Spouse: Minati Chakravarty

Kalyan Kumar Chakravarty (in Bangla কল্যাণ কুমার চক্রবর্তী, Hindi कल्याण कुमार चक्रवर्ती) (born 2 September 1947) is an Indian historian, art historian, writer, action anthropologist, academician and administrator, known for his intercultural and cross-disciplinary research and activism. A retired officer of the Indian Administrative Service (IAS) of the 1970 batch (retired 2007), he was appointed Chairman of the Lalit Kala Akademi, India’s federal fine arts academy, in 2013.

He has written books covering archaeology, rock art, art history, tribal issues, musicology, public policy, and the philosophy of religion and art

== Early life ==
Chakravarty was born to an Indian Bengali family in West Bengal in 1947. His father was Hiralal Chakravarti, a historian, academician and civil servant. The family originally hailed from Bikrampur in Dhaka district, now in Bangladesh, and his father’s home was in Sunamganj District in Sylhet, now in Bangladesh. However, the family had lived in India, mostly Kolkata (then Calcutta) since the times of Presidencies and Provinces of British India.

Chakravarty lived in various towns of West Bengal during his childhood and in various cities and towns of Madhya Pradesh and Chhattisgarh during his professional life, including Bhopal and Raipur. He has also lived in New Delhi, India in the later years of his administrative career. He has also lived in Boston, MA. He currently lives in Kolkata.

== Education ==
Chakravarty had a liberal art education in Ballygunge Government High School, Calcutta. He graduated with Honours in History from Presidency University, Kolkata in 1966 and obtained his Post Graduate degree in Modern History from University of Calcutta in 1968. He joined the Indian Administrative Service (IAS) in 1970.

While in service, he went on to acquire a Graduate degree (M.P.A) in Public Administration from John F. Kennedy School of Government, Harvard University (1985) & an A.M. (1987), and a Ph.D. in Fine Arts (1992) from the Harvard Graduate School of Arts and Sciences.

== Career ==
The major milestones in his career are:

- Indian Administrative Service, 1970 to 2007.
- Member of Governing Body, Centurion University of Technology and Management, Andhra Pradesh.
- Chancellor, National University of Educational Planning and Administration, 2009 to 2014.
- Chairman, Lalit Kala Akademi, New Delhi, 2013 to 2015.
- Member Secretary and Executive Trustee, Indira Gandhi National Centre for the Arts, New Delhi, 2004 to 2009.
- Director General, National Museum, New Delhi, 2004 to 2006.
- Vice-chancellor, National Museum Institute, New Delhi, 2004 to 2006.

== Publications ==
=== Books ===
- Gwalior Fort: Art, Culture & History by Kalyan Kumar Chakravarty, Arnold-Heinemann on behalf of the Director, Archaeology and Museums, Govt. of Madhya Pradesh, 1984, 107p. ISBN 0391032232
- Walking With Siva: Cognitive Roots of Indian Art, Archaeology and Religion
- Art of India: Orchha
- Early Buddhist Art of Bodh-Gaya
- Traditional Water Management Systems of India, co-ed. with G.L. Badam (National Museum of Man, Bhopal and Aryan Books International, Delhi, 2005 and 2006 respectively).
- Text and Variations of The Mahabharata: Contextual, Regional and Performative Traditions (Samiksika Series No. 2) ed. by Kalyan Kumar Chakravarty, National Mission for Manuscripts, IGNCA and Munshiram Manoharlal Publishers Pvt. Ltd., New Delhi, 2009.
- The Art of India Khajuraho
- Bhojapura Mandira: Samanvaya Kī Kalpanā
- Restoring Human Culture and Biospheric Environment: A New Museum Movement
- Indian Rock Art and Its Global Context
- भारतीय परिवार: मनुष्य के अस्तित्व के लिए वैकल्पिक सोच (The Indian Family: An Alternative Strategy for Human Survival)
- Bounteous Tree: Treasure of Indian Art and Culture (2 Volumes)
- Indigeneity: Culture and Representation by K.K. Chakravarty, G.N. Devy & Geoffrey V. Davis (Orient Blackswan, 2009)
- Voice and Memory: Indigenous Imagination and Expression by K.K. Chakravarty, G.N. Devy, Geoffery V. Davis (Orient Blackswan, 2011)
- Narrating Nomadism: Tales of Recovery and Resistance ed. by G.N. Devy, Geoffery V. Davis & K.K. Chakravarty (Routledge, 2013)
- Knowing Differently: The Challenge of the Indigenous ed. by G.N. Devy, Geoffery V. Davis & K.K. Chakravarty (Routledge, 2014)
- The Language Loss of the Indigenous ed. by G.N. Devy, Geoffery V. Davis & K.K. Chakravarty (Routledge, 2016).
- Performing Identities: Celebrating Indigeneity in The Arts, ed. by G.N. Devy, Geoffery V. Davis & K.K. Chakravarty (Routledge, London, 2015).
- Tattvabodha: Essays from the Lecture Series of the National Mission for Manuscripts Volume II ed. by Kalyan Kumar Chakravarty, National Mission for Manuscripts, IGNCA and Munshiram Manoharlal Publishers Pvt. Ltd., 2008.

== Honours/Awards ==
- Ford Foundation and Asian Cultural Council Fellowship, Harvard University (1991–92)
- Kahn Fellowship of the Asian Cultural Council, at Harvard University (1986–87)
- Mason Fellowship at J.F.K. School of Government, Harvard University (1984–85)
- Robbins prize in Indian Art Studies, Harvard University (1987)
