= Hayel Daoud =

Jordanian former minister of Awqaf and Religious Affairs

Hayel Daoud (born 1959) is the Jordanian former minister of Awqaf and Religious Affairs. He is also termed as the Country's Islamic affairs minister.

== Early life and education ==
Daoud was born in 1959 in Amman and earned a PhD in Islamic jurisprudence from the University of Jordan.He worked as assistant professor at the University of Jordan's faculty of Sharia.
