= Lamphelpat =

Lamphelpat (Meitei: /ləm.pʰel.pát/)
- town
- Location in Manipur, India Lamphelpat (India)
- Coordinates: 24.825067°N 93.908987°E
- Country: India
- State: Manipur
- District: Imphal West

Language(s)
  - Official: Meitei (officially called Manipuri)
- Time zone: UTC+5:30 (IST)
- Postal code: 795004
- Vehicle registration: MN
- Website: manipur.gov.in

Lamphelpat (Meitei pronunciation: /ləm.pʰel.pát/) is the district headquarter of Imphal West district in the state of Manipur, India. It is a suburb of Imphal city, the capital of Manipur.

== Etymology ==
The name "Lamphelpat" (/ləm.pʰel.pát/) is made up of two Meitei language words, "Lamphel" (Meitei: ꯂꯝꯐꯦꯜ) and "Pāt" (Meitei: ꯄꯥꯠ). "Lamphel" (/ləm.pʰel/) is the Meitei name of a place in Imphal. "Pāt" (/pát/) means lake in Meitei.
