= Kangchup =

Village in Manipur, India

- Village
- Interactive map of Kangchup
- Location within Manipur Location within India
- Coordinates: 24.8594°N 93.8097°E
- Country: India
- State: Manipur
- District: Imphal West district
- Subdivision: Lamshang

Population (2011)
  - Total: 286
- Time zone: UTC+5:30 (IST)
- Vehicle registration: MN

Kangchup is a village in the Lamshang subdivision of Imphal West district, in the Indian state of Manipur. The village and nearby hamlets were impacted by the Meitei–Kuki ethnic violence that started in Manipur in May 2023. By reports from 2024 to 2025, some people began to return, and rehabilitation efforts were underway.

== Geography ==
Kangchup is located within the Lamshang subdivision of Imphal West district. The village is accessible via local district roads which connect to the broader Imphal–Kangchup Road. An existing project aims to extend it to Tamenglong.

== Demographics ==
According to the 2011 Census;

- Kangchup had a population of 286 people with 64 families residing. 138 people are males while 148 are females.
- Average sex ratio was 1072 females per 1000 males.
- There were 32 children under 6.
- The child sex ratio was 778 females per 1000 males.
- The literacy rate was 83.46%.

== Constituency ==
The Kangchup village is part of the Lamsang Assembly constituency and the Inner Manipur Lok Sabha constituency.

== Economy ==
The economy of Kangchup relies primarily on agriculture and is supplemented by small-scale trade and labour in nearby markets.

== Transport ==
According to the 2011 District Census Handbook (Village & Town Directory) for Imphal West, Kangchup has local road access and public transport options. The village is located along the Imphal-Kangchup-Tamenglong Road, a key route that is being upgraded through the ABD-financed SASEC Road Connectivity Investment Programme.

The land-acquisition notices from the Imphal West district administration identify Kangchup as part of the road corridor.

== 2023-2025 Manipur violence ==
During the outbreak of ethnic violence in Manipur in May 2023, Kangchup was one of the areas covered by national and international media as affected by the conflict and the resulting humanitarian crisis.

In the following years, news reports highlighted ongoing security incidents in parts of Imphal West.

The reports also mentioned that some displaced families began to return. By mid-2025, several national outlets reported that some Meitei families started going back to Kangchup and nearby villages as part of rehabilitation and recovery efforts.
