= Wangoi =

- Town
- Location in Manipur, India Wangoi (India)
- Coordinates: 24.65861°N 93.8988°E
- Country: India
- State: Manipur
- District: Imphal West

Population (2001)
  - Total: 7,872

Languages
  - Official: Meitei
- Time zone: UTC+5:30 (IST)
- Vehicle registration: MN
- Website: manipur.gov.in

Wangoi (Meitei: ꯋꯥꯡꯒꯣꯏ) is a town and a Municipal Council in Imphal West district in the Indian state of Manipur.

== Demographics ==
As of the 2001 India census, Wangoi had a population of 7,872. Males and fea

males constitute 50% each of the population. Wangoi has an average literacy rate of 64%, higher than the national average of 59.5%: male literacy is 76%, and female literacy 53%. Of the town's population, 13% is under 6 years of age.

== Politics ==
Wangoi is part of Inner Manipur (Lok Sabha constituency).
