= Hiyang hiren =

Indian boat

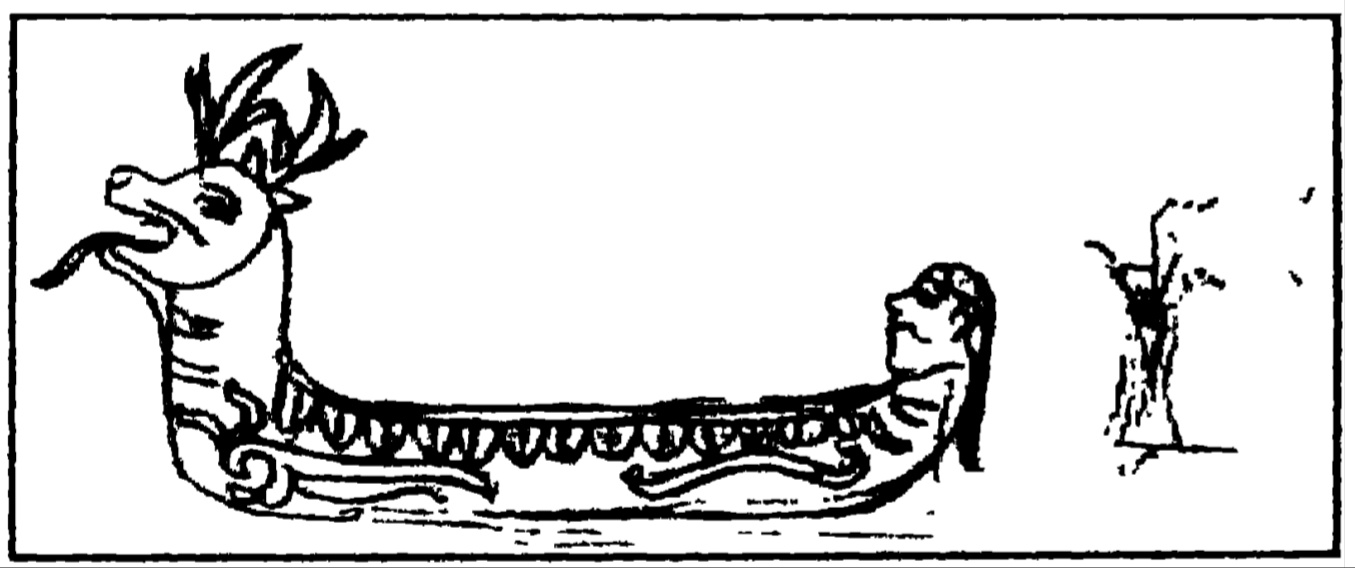

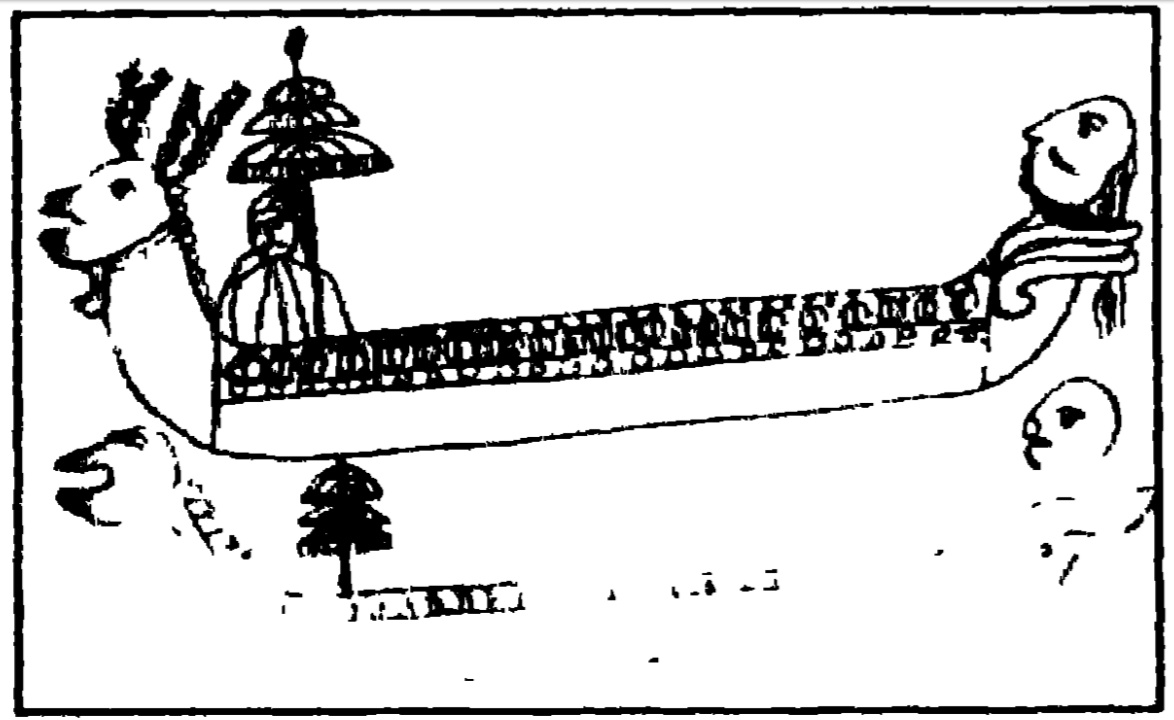

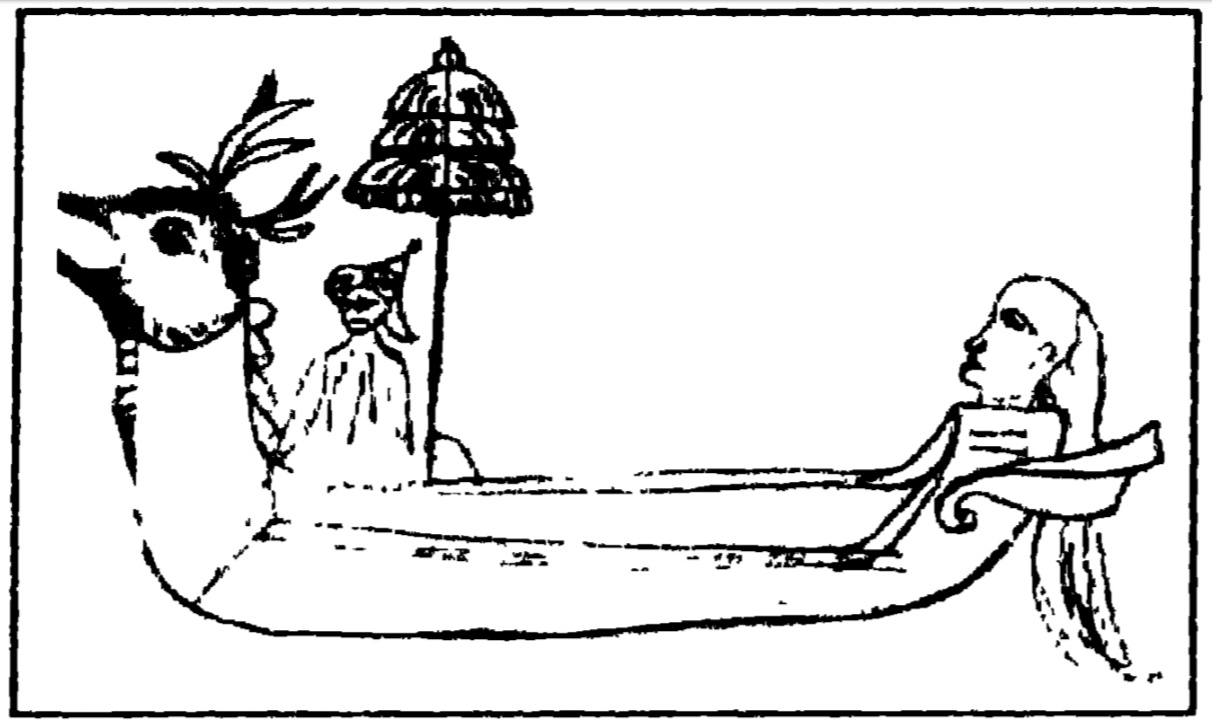

Hiyang hiren (Meitei: ꯍꯤꯌꯥꯡ ꯍꯤꯔꯦꯟ, lit. 'large race boat') is a traditional royal race boat, used at the Hiyang Tannaba ceremony in the religious festival of Lai Haraoba. The boat is regarded as invested with spiritual powers and is associated with religious rites. The Meitei people believe that the worship of the boat will bring protection from the evils. The Hiyangloi Hanchapa is responsible for making the Hiyang hiren, which is decorated with the stern (hirubak) the head of the Sangai deer. The boat is around 54 feet long, and its racing ceremony is held annually for two days.
