= Lamshang =

Lamsang
- Town
- Location in Manipur, India Lamsang (India)
- Coordinates: 24.82712°N 93.88738°E
- Country: India
- State: Manipur
- District: Imphal West

Population (2001)
  - Total: 6,530

Languages
  - Official: Meitei
- Time zone: UTC+5:30 (IST)
- Vehicle registration: MN
- Website: manipur.gov.in

Lamsang (also spelt as Lamshang) is a town and a Municipal Council in Imphal West district in the Indian state of Manipur.

== Demographics ==
As of 2001 India census, Lamshang had a population of 6530. Males constitute 50% of the population and females 50%. Lamshang has an average literacy rate of 61%, higher than the national average of 59.5%: male literacy is 69%, and female literacy is 53%. In Lamshang, 13% of the population is under 6 years of age.

== Politics ==
Lamsang is part of Inner Manipur (Lok Sabha constituency).
