= Imphal West district =

- District of Manipur
- Location in Manipur
- Coordinates: 24°49′N 93°54′E
- Country: India
- State: Manipur
- Named for: Imphal Valley
- Headquarters: Lamphelpat

Area
  - Total: 558 km^{2} (215 sq mi)
  - Rank: 11

Population (2011)
  - Total: 517,992
  - Density: 928/km^{2} (2,400/sq mi)

Language(s)
  - Official: Meiteilon (officially called Manipuri)
  - Regional: Imphal dialect
- Time zone: UTC+5:30 (IST)
- ISO 3166 code: IN-MN-WI
- Vehicle registration: MN
- Website: imphalwest.nic.in

Imphal West district (Meitei pronunciation:/ˈɪmfəl or ɪmˈfɑːl/) is one of the sixteen districts of Manipur state in northeastern India. As of 2011, it is the most populous district in the state. The Imphal dialect is the standard dialect of Meitei language, officially known as Manipuri language, and is natively used in the region.

== Geography ==
Lamphelpat city is the administrative headquarters of the district. The district occupies an area of 519 km^{2}.

== Economy ==
The district ranks first on the basis of "District Infrastructure Index " calculated under the patronage of Department of Development of North Eastern Region.

== Demographics ==
Languages of Imphal West district (2011)
1. Manipuri (90.9%)
2. Kabui (2.01%)
3. Nepali (2.01%)
4. Hindi (1.07%)
5. Others (4.01%)

Historical population
Year	Pop.	±%
1951	57,340	—
1961	79,005	+37.8%
1971	108,785	+37.7%
1981	141,760	+30.3%
1991	180,773	+27.5%
2001	208,368	+15.3%
2011	237,399	+13.9%
Source: Census of India

Religions in Imphal West district (2011)
Hinduism	74.81%
Other (Sanamahi and Heraka)	14.87%
Islam	4.69%
Christianity	4.51%
Other or not stated	1.12%

According to the 2011 census, Imphal West district has a population of 517,992. This gives it a ranking of 545th in India (out of a total of 640). The district has a population density of 992 inhabitants per square kilometre (2,570/sq mi) . Its population growth rate over the decade 2001-2011 was 15.82%. Imphal West has a sex ratio of 1029 females for every 1000 males, and a literacy rate of 86.7%. 62.33% of the population lived in urban areas. Scheduled Castes and Scheduled Tribes make up 3.19% and 4.66% of the population respectively.

	Population	Percentage of Total Pop.
All Scheduled Tribes	24.161	4.7%
Kuki-Zo tribes (Note: The Kuki-Zo tribes include Gangte, Hmar, Paite, Simte, Sukte, Thadou, Vaiphei, Zou, and some smaller tribes designated as "Any Kuki" and "Any Lushai (Mizo)".)	8,473	1.6%
Naga tribes (Note: The Naga tribes include Angami, Kabui, Kacha Naga, Mao, Maram, Poumai, Sema and Tangkhul.)	13,029	2.5%
Old Kuki/Naga (Note: The Old Kuki tribes retaining the Kuki classification include: Aimol, Chiru, Kom, Koireng, Kharam, and Ralte. The tribes under the Naga umbrella include: Anal, Chothe, Koirao, Lamkang, Maring, Moyon, Monsang, Purum and Tarao.)	1,918	0.4%

=== Languages ===
As per 2011 census, the main languages spoken in Imphal West district are Manipuri (470,852), Kabui (10,408), Nepali (10,391), and Hindi (5,248).

== Administrative divisions ==
The district is divided into 4 sub-divisions and 10 Circles:

- Lamphelpat Sub-Division: Lamphelpat
- Patsoi Sub-Division: Patsoi, Konthoujam
- Lamsang Sub-Division: Salam, Lamsang, Sekmai
- Wangoi Sub-Division: Hiyangthang, Lilong Chajing, Wangoi, Mayang Imphal

== Areas under Imphal Urban Agglomeration ==
- Lamphelpat
- Patsoi
- Hiyangthang
- Lilong Chajing

== Notable people ==
- Beoncy Laishram, first transgender doctor in North East India

== See also ==
- Imphal Municipal Corporation
- List of populated places in Imphal West district
