= Keirao Assembly constituency =

Legislative Assembly constituency in Manipur State, India

Coordinates: 24.71°N 93.97°E

Keirao
- Constituency No. 6 for the Manipur Legislative Assembly

Constituency details
- Country: India
- Region: Northeast India
- State: Manipur
- District: Imphal East
- Lok Sabha constituency: Inner Manipur
- Established: 1972
- Total electors: 30,224
- Reservation: None

Member of Legislative Assembly
- 12th Manipur Legislative Assembly
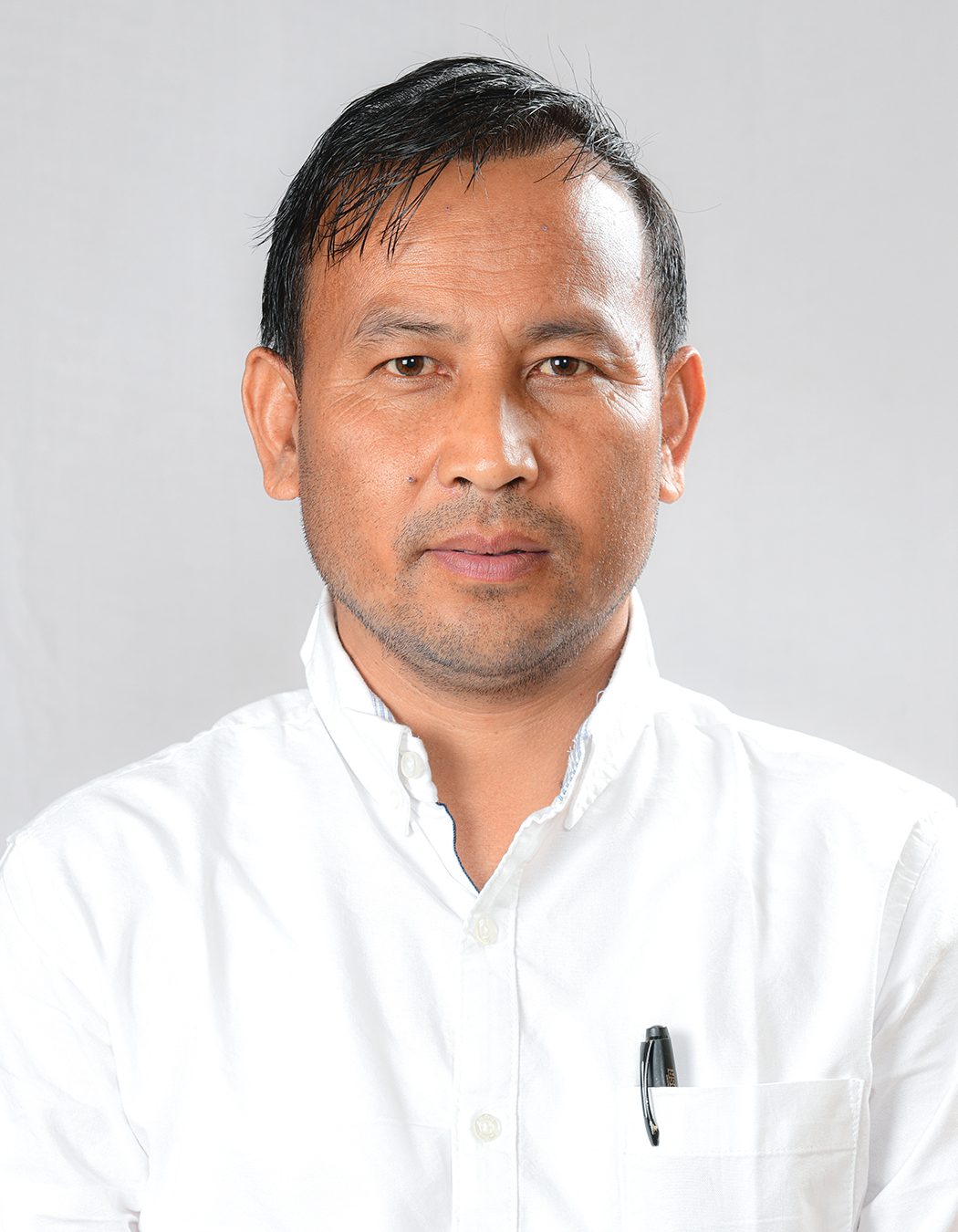
- Incumbent Lourembam Rameshwor Meetei
- Party: Bharatiya Janata Party
- Elected year: 2022

Keirao Legislative Assembly constituency is one of the 60 Legislative Assembly constituencies of Manipur state in India.

It is part of Imphal East district.

== Extent ==
Keirao is the 6th among the 60 assembly constituencies of Manipur. It has 39 parts namely: 1 - Kiyamgei Maning Leikai (A), 2 - Kiyamgei Maning Leikai (B), 3 - Kiyamgei (B), 4 - Kiyamgei(C-I), 5 - Kyamgei Khoirom Leikai, 6 - Kiyamgei Mamang Leikai, 7 - Kiyamgei Mamang Leikai (B), 8 - Kiyamgei Awang Leikai, 9 - Takhok Makha, 10 - Kiyamgei Muslim (South) (A), 11 - Kiyamgei Muslim (South) (B), 12 - Arapati Maning (A), 13 - Arapati Maning (B), 14 - Arapati Nongpok(A), 15 - Arapati Nongpok(B), 16 - Urup, 17 - Urup Naokal (A), 18 - Urup Naokal (B), 19 - Urup Awang Leikai, 20 - Urup Muslim, 21 - Keirao Makting, 22 - Keirao Makting Mayai (A), 23 - Keirao Makting Mayai (B), 24 - Keirao Makting Awang Leikai (A), 25 - Keirao Makting Awang Leikai (B), 26 - Keirao Bitra (A), 27 - Keirao Bitra (B), 28 - Keirao Langdum (A), 29 - Keirao Langdum (B), 30 - Keirao Wangkhem, 31 - Khannarok, 32 - Phunal Maring, 33 - Waithou Chiru, 34 - Thiyam Konjil (A), 35 - Thiyam Konjil (B), 36 - Chanam Sandrok (A), 37 - Chanam Sandrok (B), 38 - Sandang Senba, and 39 - Lemba Khul.

== Members of the Legislative Assembly ==
Year	Winner	Party
1972	Mohamad Jaluddin	Manipur Peoples Party
1974	Mohamad Jaluddin	Manipur Peoples Party
1980	Abdul Matalip	Independent politician
1984	Abdul Matalip	Indian National Congress
1990	Hidam Bidur Singh	Janata Dal
1995	Hidam Bidur Singh	Indian National Congress
2000	Hidam Bidur Singh	Manipur State Congress Party
2002	Md. Alauddin Khan	Indian National Congress
2007	Md. Alauddin Khan	Indian National Congress
2012	Karam Thamarjit Singh	Manipur State Congress Party
2017	Lourembam Rameshwor Meetei	Bharatiya Janata Party
2022	Lourembam Rameshwor Meetei	Bharatiya Janata Party

== Election results ==
Vote share of winning candidates
2022	61.68%
2017	22.81%
2012	38.71%
2007	35.64%
2002	28.17%
2000	25.30%
1995	27.97%
1990	38.42%
1984	21.23%
1980	25.64%
1974	48.34%
1972	51.95%

=== 2027 Assembly election ===
2027 Manipur Legislative Assembly election: Keirao
Party	Candidate	Votes	%	±%
INC				
NDA				
NOTA	None of the above			
Majority				
Turnout				
gain from		Swing		

=== 2022 Assembly election ===
2022 Manipur Legislative Assembly election: Keirao
Party	Candidate	Votes	%	±%
BJP	Lourembam Rameshwor Meetei	17,335	61.68%	38.88%
NPP	Md. Nasiruddin Khan	9,126	32.47%	
NCP	Md. Islamuddin Khan	983	3.50%	−8.91%
INC	Thongram Tony Meitei	249	0.89%	−17.16%
SS	Toijam Debananda Singh	202	0.72%	
Margin of victory		8,209	29.21%	27.15%
Turnout		28,103	92.98%	−1.24%
Registered electors		30,224		8.99%
BJP hold		Swing	38.88%	

=== 2017 Assembly election ===
2017 Manipur Legislative Assembly election: Keirao
Party	Candidate	Votes	%	±%
BJP	Lourembam Rameshwor Meetei	5,959	22.81%	19.98%
Independent	Md. Nasiruddin Khan	5,421	20.75%	
INC	Karam Thamarjit Singh	4,715	18.04%	−14.34%
NEIDP	Thongram Gopen	4,477	17.13%	
NCP	Md. Islamuddin Khan	3,241	12.40%	
LJP	Takhellambam Samananda Singh	1,446	5.53%	
Manipur National Democratic Front	Ningthoujam Itomba Meetei	685	2.62%	
Margin of victory		538	2.06%	−4.27%
Turnout		26,130	94.22%	3.28%
Registered electors		27,732		10.14%
BJP gain from MSCP		Swing	-15.91%	

=== 2012 Assembly election ===
2012 Manipur Legislative Assembly election: Keirao
Party	Candidate	Votes	%	±%
MSCP	Karam Thamarjit Singh	8,865	38.71%	3.08%
INC	Md. Alauddin Khan	7,415	32.38%	−3.26%
Independent	Md. Islamuddin Khan	3,391	14.81%	
AITC	Thongram Gopen	2,111	9.22%	
BJP	Thongram Tony Meitei	647	2.83%	
Independent	Ningthoujam Itomba Meetei	320	1.40%	
Margin of victory		1,450	6.33%	6.32%
Turnout		22,899	90.94%	1.16%
Registered electors		25,179		5.36%
MSCP gain from INC		Swing	3.07%	

=== 2007 Assembly election ===
2007 Manipur Legislative Assembly election: Keirao
Party	Candidate	Votes	%	±%
INC	Md. Alauddin Khan	7,648	35.64%	7.47%
MSCP	Karam Thamarjit Singh	7,646	35.63%	19.86%
JD(S)	Thongram Tony Meitei	5,350	24.93%	
CPI	Yensembam Angou	479	2.23%	
Independent	Hidam Bidur Singh	334	1.56%	
Margin of victory		2	0.01%	−8.09%
Turnout		21,457	89.79%	−5.88%
Registered electors		23,898		20.31%
INC hold		Swing	7.47%	

=== 2002 Assembly election ===
2002 Manipur Legislative Assembly election: Keirao
Party	Candidate	Votes	%	±%
INC	Md. Alauddin Khan	5,293	28.17%	15.40%
Manipur National Conference	Karam Thamarjit Singh	3,771	20.07%	
FPM	Hidam Bidur Singh	3,492	18.59%	15.76%
MPP	Salam Lala	3,268	17.39%	14.28%
MSCP	Thongram Tony Meitei	2,964	15.78%	−9.52%
Margin of victory		1,522	8.10%	−2.14%
Turnout		18,788	95.67%	−1.23%
Registered electors		19,864		2.08%
INC gain from MSCP		Swing	0.20%	

=== 2000 Assembly election ===
2000 Manipur Legislative Assembly election: Keirao
Party	Candidate	Votes	%	±%
MSCP	Hidam Bidur Singh	4,713	25.30%	
BJP	Th. Gerani Meitei	2,805	15.06%	
JD(S)	Alauddin	2,419	12.98%	
INC	Najimuddin	2,380	12.78%	−15.19%
NCP	K. Rajmani Singh	2,029	10.89%	
SAP	O. Raghu Singh	1,962	10.53%	0.30%
CPI(M)	Morung Keishing	1,216	6.53%	
MPP	Ch. Shamjai Singh	580	3.11%	−15.32%
FPM	H. Nabachandra Singh	526	2.82%	
Margin of victory		1,908	10.24%	0.71%
Turnout		18,630	96.39%	−0.51%
Registered electors		19,460		6.58%
MSCP gain from INC		Swing	-2.67%	

=== 1995 Assembly election ===
1995 Manipur Legislative Assembly election: Keirao
Party	Candidate	Votes	%	±%
INC	Hidam Bidur Singh	4,695	27.97%	10.60%
MPP	Chingakham Shyamjai Singh	3,095	18.44%	−2.30%
SJP(R)	Abdul Matalip	2,491	14.84%	
SAP	Nahakpam Bijoy	1,717	10.23%	
CPI	Musamuddin	1,716	10.22%	
Independent	Jalaluddin	1,395	8.31%	
JD	Alauddin	692	4.12%	
Independent	Yumlembam Ibochou	612	3.65%	
Independent	Naorem Sanamacha	373	2.22%	
Margin of victory		1,600	9.53%	−5.46%
Turnout		16,786	96.90%	2.36%
Registered electors		18,259		−6.18%
INC gain from JD		Swing	-10.45%	

=== 1990 Assembly election ===
1990 Manipur Legislative Assembly election: Keirao
Party	Candidate	Votes	%	±%
JD	Hidam Bidur Singh	7,034	38.42%	
INS(SCS)	Konthoujam Rajmani Singh	4,289	23.42%	
MPP	Jalaludin	3,797	20.74%	1.06%
INC	Md. Abdul Matlib	3,181	17.37%	−3.86%
Margin of victory		2,745	14.99%	14.35%
Turnout		18,310	94.54%	3.59%
Registered electors		19,461		22.54%
JD gain from INC		Swing	17.18%	

=== 1984 Assembly election ===
1984 Manipur Legislative Assembly election: Keirao
Party	Candidate	Votes	%	±%
INC	Abdul Matalip	2,990	21.23%	
Independent	Konthoujam Rajmani Singh	2,900	20.59%	
MPP	Jalaluddin	2,771	19.68%	18.42%
Independent	Thangja Moba	2,266	16.09%	
CPI	Takhellambam Tomba	1,557	11.06%	−12.18%
Independent	Hidam Nabachandra	1,093	7.76%	
Independent	Jameruddin	505	3.59%	
Margin of victory		90	0.64%	−1.77%
Turnout		14,082	90.95%	7.00%
Registered electors		15,881		12.09%
INC gain from Independent		Swing	-4.40%	

=== 1980 Assembly election ===
1980 Manipur Legislative Assembly election: Keirao
Party	Candidate	Votes	%	±%
Independent	Abdul Matalip	2,985	25.64%	
CPI	Takhellambam Tomba	2,705	23.23%	
INC(U)	Konthoujam Rajmani Singh	2,369	20.35%	
JP	Jalaluddin	2,316	19.89%	
INC(I)	Deben Thigujamba	760	6.53%	
Independent	Md. Oli Haji	206	1.77%	
Independent	Thokchom Gouro	156	1.34%	
MPP	Laishram Ibomeha	146	1.25%	−47.08%
Margin of victory		280	2.40%	−16.50%
Turnout		11,643	83.95%	−2.87%
Registered electors		14,168		32.87%
Independent gain from MPP		Swing	-22.70%	

=== 1974 Assembly election ===
1974 Manipur Legislative Assembly election: Keirao
Party	Candidate	Votes	%	±%
MPP	Mohamad Jaluddin	4,344	48.34%	−3.62%
INC	Ngangbam Bira	2,645	29.43%	−2.67%
Socialist Labour Party (India)	Heikham Momom Singh	1,621	18.04%	
INC(O)	Thokchom Gouro	377	4.19%	
Margin of victory		1,699	18.91%	−0.95%
Turnout		8,987	86.82%	3.41%
Registered electors		10,663		14.77%
MPP hold		Swing	-3.62%	

=== 1972 Assembly election ===
1972 Manipur Legislative Assembly election: Keirao
Party	Candidate	Votes	%	±%
MPP	Mohamad Jaluddin	3,964	51.95%	
INC	Phanijoubam Muhol Singh	2,449	32.10%	
Socialist Labour Party (India)	Thokchom Kunjo	1,217	15.95%	
Margin of victory		1,515	19.86%	
Turnout		7,630	83.41%	
Registered electors		9,291		
MPP win (new seat)				

== See also ==
- List of constituencies of the Manipur Legislative Assembly
- Imphal East district
