= Yaiskul Assembly constituency =

Legislative Assembly constituency in Manipur State, India

Coordinates: 24.79°N 93.94°E

Yaiskul
- Constituency No. 14 for the Manipur Legislative Assembly

Constituency details
- Country: India
- Region: Northeast India
- State: Manipur
- District: Imphal East
- Lok Sabha constituency: Inner Manipur
- Established: 1974
- Total electors: 26,794
- Reservation: None

Member of Legislative Assembly
- 12th Manipur Legislative Assembly
- Incumbent Thokchom Satyabrata Singh
- Party: Bharatiya Janata Party
- Elected year: 2022

Yaiskul Legislative Assembly constituency is one of the 60 Legislative Assembly constituencies of Manipur state in India.

It is part of Imphal East district.

== Extent ==
Yaiskul is the 14th among 60 assembly constituencies of Manipur. It consists of 38 parts namely: 1 - Moirangkhom (A), 2 - Moirangkhom (B), 3 - Moirangkhom (C), 4 - Janmasthan, 5 - Moirangkhom, 6 - Wangkhei Ningthem Pukhri Mapal (A), 7 - Wangkhei Ningthem Pukhri Mapal (B), 8 - Wangkhei Ningthem Pukhri Mapal (C), 9 - Loklaobung Sougaijam Mamang Leikai, 10 - Moirangkhom Loklaobung, 11 - Wangkhei Thangapat Mapal (A), 12 - Wangkhei Puja Lampak, 13 - Wangkhei Thangapat Mapal (B), 14 - Brahamapur Nahabam Leikai (A), 15 - Brahamapur Nahabam Leikai (B), 16 - Wangkhei Konsam Leikai (B), 17 - Wangkhei Konsam Leikai (C), 18 - Yaiskul Yumnam Leikai, 19 - Shougaijam Leirak, 20 - Rajbari (A), 21 - Mahabali, 22 - Rajbari (B), 23 - Rajbari (C), 24 - Brahamapur Aribam Leikai (A), 25 - Brahamapur Aribam Leikai (B), 26 - Brahamapur Mangge Makhong (B), 27 - Brahamapur Nahabam (A), 28 - Brahamapur Mange Makhong (A), 29 - Wangkhei Konsam Leikai (A), 30 - Wangkhei Konsam Leikai (D), 31 - Wangkhei Tokpam Leikai (West), 32 - Wangkhei Thangjam Leikai (B), 33 - Wangkhei Konsam Leikai (E), 34 - Wangkhei Konsam Leikai (F), 35 - Wangkhei Thangjam Leikai (A), 36 - Brahmapur Bheigyabati Leikai (A), 37 - Brahmapur Bheigyabati Leikai (B), and 38 - Singjamei Wangma Bheigyabati Leikai.

== Members of the Legislative Assembly ==
Year	Member	Party
1974	Rajkumar Dorendra Singh	Manipur Peoples Party
1980	Rajkumar Dorendra Singh	Indian National Congress
1984	Rajkumar Dorendra Singh	Indian National Congress
1990	Rajkumar Dorendra Singh	Indian National Congress
1995	Elangbam Kunjeswar Singh	Bharatiya Janata Party
2000	Rajkumar Dorendra Singh	Bharatiya Janata Party
2002	Rajkumar Dorendra Singh	Bharatiya Janata Party
2007	Elangbam Kunjeswar Singh	Indian National Congress
2009 by-election	Elangbam Suraj Singh	Indian National Congress
2012	Elangbam Chand Singh	Indian National Congress
2017	Thokchom Satyabrata Singh	Bharatiya Janata Party
2022	Thokchom Satyabrata Singh	Bharatiya Janata Party

== Election results ==
Vote share of winning candidates
2022	40.25%
2017	36.60%
2012	33.64%
2009 by-election	49.95%
2007	59.88%
2002	45.01%
2000	51.09%
1995	35.88%
1990	42.34%
1984	41.76%
1980	41.84%
1974	36.15%

=== 2027 Assembly election ===
2027 Manipur Legislative Assembly election: Yaiskul
Party	Candidate	Votes	%	±%
INC				
NDA				
NOTA	None of the above			
Majority				
Turnout				
gain from		Swing		

=== Assembly Election 2022 ===
2022 Manipur Legislative Assembly election: Yaiskul
Party	Candidate	Votes	%	±%
BJP	Thokchom Satyabrata Singh	9,724	40.25%	▲3.65
NPP	Huidrom Vikramjit Singh	9,092	37.64%	New
JD(U)	Thounaojam Brinda	4,574	18.93%	New
INC	Ningombam Helendro Singh	526	2.18%	▼31.82
SS	Rajkumar Suraj Singh	122	0.51%	New
NOTA	None of the Above	119	0.49%	▼0.78
Margin of victory		632	2.62%	▲0.01
Turnout		24,157	90.16%	▲3.82
Registered electors		26,794		▲5.64
BJP hold		Swing	▲3.65	

=== Assembly Election 2017 ===
2017 Manipur Legislative Assembly election: Yaiskul
Party	Candidate	Votes	%	±%
BJP	Thokchom Satyabrata Singh	8,014	36.60%	New
INC	Elangbam Chand Singh	7,444	34.00%	▲0.36
Independent	N. Helendro Singh	5,621	25.67%	New
LJP	Athokpam Keshor Singh	397	1.81%	New
NOTA	None of the Above	278	1.27%	New
CPI	Yumlembam Nogen	143	0.65%	New
Margin of victory		570	2.60%	▲0.96
Turnout		21,897	86.33%	▲2.49
Registered electors		25,363		▲7.57
BJP gain from INC		Swing	▲2.96	

=== Assembly Election 2012 ===
2012 Manipur Legislative Assembly election: Yaiskul
Party	Candidate	Votes	%	±%
INC	Elangbam Chand Singh	6,650	33.64%	▼16.32
Independent	Hanjabam Jayadeva Sharma	6,325	31.99%	New
AITC	Hareshwar Goshwami	4,662	23.58%	New
Independent	Thokchom Satyabrata Singh	2,133	10.79%	New
Margin of victory		325	1.64%	▼3.16
Turnout		19,770	83.85%	▲0.41
Registered electors		23,579		▲0.29
INC hold		Swing	▼16.32	

=== Assembly By-election 2009 ===
2009 Manipur Legislative Assembly by-election: Yaiskul
Party	Candidate	Votes	%	±%
INC	Elangbam Suraj Singh	9,799	49.95%	▼9.92
Independent	Hanjabam Jayadeva Sharma	8,856	45.15%	New
JD(S)	Soubam Rajendrakumar Singh	834	4.25%	New
Independent	Aribam Jagdish Sharma	127	0.65%	New
Margin of victory		943	4.81%	▼17.17
Turnout		19,616	83.43%	▲1.49
Registered electors		23,511		▼0.27
INC hold		Swing	▼9.92	

=== Assembly Election 2007 ===
2007 Manipur Legislative Assembly election: Yaiskul
Party	Candidate	Votes	%	±%
INC	Elangbam Kunjeswar Singh	11,567	59.88%	▲21.12
MPP	Rajkumar Dorendra Singh	7,321	37.90%	New
RJD	Huidrom Badankumar Singh	356	1.84%	New
Margin of victory		4,246	21.98%	▲15.73
Turnout		19,318	81.95%	▼0.62
Registered electors		23,574		▲8.06
INC gain from BJP		Swing		

=== Assembly Election 2002 ===
2002 Manipur Legislative Assembly election: Yaiskul
Party	Candidate	Votes	%	±%
BJP	Rajkumar Dorendra Singh	8,107	45.01%	▼6.08
INC	Elangbam Kunjeswar Singh	6,981	38.76%	New
Manipur National Conference	Gurumayum Joykumar Sharma	1,669	9.27%	New
DRPP	Lt. Col. H. Sarat Singh	992	5.51%	New
SAP	D. Lungpuijei	264	1.47%	New
Margin of victory		1,126	6.25%	▲3.24
Turnout		18,013	82.57%	▼6.91
Registered electors		21,816		▲1.78
BJP hold		Swing	▼6.08	

=== Assembly Election 2000 ===
2000 Manipur Legislative Assembly election: Yaiskul
Party	Candidate	Votes	%	±%
BJP	Rajkumar Dorendra Singh	9,798	51.09%	▲15.21
MSCP	Elangbam Kunjeswar Singh	9,221	48.08%	New
Margin of victory		577	3.01%	▲0.16
Turnout		19,179	89.48%	▲0.67
Registered electors		21,434		▲15.13
BJP hold		Swing		

=== Assembly Election 1995 ===
1995 Manipur Legislative Assembly election: Yaiskul
Party	Candidate	Votes	%	±%
BJP	Elangbam Kunjeswar Singh	5,932	35.88%	New
MPP	Gurumayum Joykumar Sharma	5,461	33.03%	▲7.74
INC	Hanjabam Kunjakishor Sharma	2,613	15.80%	▼26.53
FPM	Sougaijam Somorjit Singh	1,346	8.14%	New
JD	Manihar Goswami	590	3.57%	▼28.29
JP	Loitongbam Iboyaima Singh	361	2.18%	New
Margin of victory		471	2.85%	▼7.63
Turnout		16,534	88.81%	▲0.11
Registered electors		18,617		▲4.22
BJP gain from INC		Swing	▼6.46	

=== Assembly Election 1990 ===
1990 Manipur Legislative Assembly election: Yaiskul
Party	Candidate	Votes	%	±%
INC	Rajkumar Dorendra Singh	6,708	42.34%	▲0.58
JD	Elangbam Kunjeswar Singh	5,047	31.85%	New
MPP	Gurumayum Joykumar Sharma	4,007	25.29%	▲11.92
Margin of victory		1,661	10.48%	▼8.63
Turnout		15,844	88.70%	▲6.54
Registered electors		17,863		▲18.83
INC hold		Swing		

=== Assembly Election 1984 ===
1984 Manipur Legislative Assembly election: Yaiskul
Party	Candidate	Votes	%	±%
INC	Rajkumar Dorendra Singh	5,157	41.76%	New
Independent	Ayekpam Biramangol Singh	2,796	22.64%	New
MPP	Gurumayum Joykumar Sharma	1,651	13.37%	▼5.58
Independent	Hanjabam Kunjakishor Sharma	1,487	12.04%	New
JP	W. Kulabidhu Singh	857	6.94%	▼17.97
CPI(M)	Nongmaithem Nirpen	121	0.98%	New
Independent	Maharajkumar Lakshmikanta	107	0.87%	New
Margin of victory		2,361	19.12%	▲2.19
Turnout		12,350	82.15%	▲5.52
Registered electors		15,033		▲4.56
INC gain from INC(I)		Swing	▼0.08	

=== Assembly Election 1980 ===
1980 Manipur Legislative Assembly election: Yaiskul
Party	Candidate	Votes	%	±%
INC(I)	Rajkumar Dorendra Singh	4,609	41.84%	New
JP	Ayekpam Biramangol Singh	2,744	24.91%	New
MPP	Gurumayum Joykumar Sharma	2,087	18.94%	▼17.21
INC(U)	Hawaibam Nilamani Singh	746	6.77%	New
JP(S)	Loitongbam Iboyaina Singh	553	5.02%	New
Independent	S. Norton Singh	97	0.88%	New
Margin of victory		1,865	16.93%	▲12.75
Turnout		11,017	76.63%	▼8.06
Registered electors		14,377		▲32.64
INC(I) gain from MPP		Swing	▲5.68	

=== Assembly Election 1974 ===
1974 Manipur Legislative Assembly election: Yaiskul
Party	Candidate	Votes	%	±%
MPP	Rajkumar Dorendra Singh	3,319	36.15%	New
INC	Hawaibam Nilamani Singh	2,935	31.97%	New
Socialist Party (India)	Laisram Achaw Singh	2,778	30.26%	New
Margin of victory		384	4.18%	
Turnout		9,180	84.69%	
Registered electors		10,839		
MPP win (new seat)				

== See also ==
- List of constituencies of the Manipur Legislative Assembly
- Imphal East district
