= Kangpokpi Assembly constituency =

Legislative Assembly constituency in Manipur State, India

Coordinates: 25.15°N 93.97°E

Kangpokpi
- Constituency for the Manipur Legislative Assembly

Constituency details
- Country: India
- Region: Northeast India
- State: Manipur
- District: Kangpokpi
- Lok Sabha constituency: Outer Manipur
- Established: 1974
- Total electors: 28,124
- Reservation: None

Member of Legislative Assembly
- 12th Manipur Legislative Assembly
- Incumbent Nemcha Kipgen
- Party: Bharatiya Janata Party
- Elected year: 2017

Kangpokpi (Vidhan Sabha constituency) is one of the 60 Vidhan Sabha constituencies in the Indian state of Manipur.

== Members of the Legislative Assembly ==
Year	Winner	Party
1974	Kishore Thapa	Indian National Congress
1980	Kishore Thapa	Indian National Congress
1984	Kishore Thapa	Independent politician
1990	L. S. John	Janata Dal
1995	Thangminlen Kipgen	Manipur Peoples Party
2000	Thangminlen Kipgen	Nationalist Congress Party
2002	Thangminlen Kipgen	Federal Party of Manipur
2007	Thangminlen Kipgen	National People's Party
2012	Nemcha Kipgen	Manipur State Congress Party
2017	Nemcha Kipgen	Bharatiya Janata Party
2022	Nemcha Kipgen	Bharatiya Janata Party

== Election results ==
Vote share of winning candidates
2022	57.37%
2017	51.74%
2012	39.00%
2007	38.50%
2002	40.05%
2000	63.04%
1995	44.52%
1990	24.46%
1984	42.54%
1980	48.16%
1974	54.99%

=== 2027 Assembly election ===
2027 Manipur Legislative Assembly election: Kangpokpi
Party	Candidate	Votes	%	±%
INC				
NDA				
NOTA	None of the above			
Majority				
Turnout				
gain from		Swing		

=== 2022 Assembly election ===
2022 Manipur Legislative Assembly election: Kangpokpi
Party	Candidate	Votes	%	±%
BJP	Nemcha Kipgen	14,412	57.37%	5.64%
JD(U)	Soshim Gurung	9,016	35.89%	
INC	Ngamkhohen Kipgen	1,376	5.48%	
NOTA	Nota	315	1.25%	0.15%
Margin of victory		5,396	21.48%	12.67%
Turnout		25,119	89.32%	2.69%
Registered electors		28,124		−6.53%
BJP hold		Swing	5.64%	

=== 2017 Assembly election ===
2017 Manipur Legislative Assembly election: Kangpokpi
Party	Candidate	Votes	%	±%
BJP	Nemcha Kipgen	13,485	51.74%	
Independent	Kharga Tamang	11,188	42.92%	
NPF	Athikho Solomon Enah	875	3.36%	
NOTA	None of the Above	289	1.11%	
NCP	Soshim Keishing	228	0.87%	
Margin of victory		2,297	8.81%	6.21%
Turnout		26,065	86.63%	25.68%
Registered electors		30,088		7.71%
BJP gain from MSCP		Swing	12.74%	

=== 2012 Assembly election ===
2012 Manipur Legislative Assembly election: Kangpokpi
Party	Candidate	Votes	%	±%
MSCP	Nemcha Kipgen	6,639	39.00%	
AITC	Khadga Bahadur	6,196	36.39%	
INC	Haokholal Hangshing	3,420	20.09%	−4.66%
JD(U)	Padam Kharel	547	3.21%	
Independent	Bhumi Prasad Basnet	222	1.30%	
Margin of victory		443	2.60%	−7.01%
Turnout		17,025	60.94%	−14.92%
Registered electors		27,934		−6.14%
MSCP gain from NPP		Swing	0.50%	

=== 2007 Assembly election ===
2007 Manipur Legislative Assembly election: Kangpokpi
Party	Candidate	Votes	%	±%
NPP	Thangminlen Kipgen	8,693	38.50%	
Independent	Kishore Thapa	6,522	28.88%	
INC	Haokholal Hangshing	5,589	24.75%	4.48%
Independent	S. Daphya	1,495	6.62%	
Independent	Tek Bahadur	185	0.82%	
Margin of victory		2,171	9.61%	−5.07%
Turnout		22,580	75.87%	−13.01%
Registered electors		29,762		12.87%
NPP gain from FPM		Swing	-1.55%	

=== 2002 Assembly election ===
2002 Manipur Legislative Assembly election: Kangpokpi
Party	Candidate	Votes	%	±%
FPM	Thangminlen	9,265	40.05%	
BJP	Hari Prasad Nepal	5,869	25.37%	12.34%
INC	V.L. Chongloi	4,690	20.27%	−3.24%
SAP	Kishore Thapa	2,276	9.84%	
NCP	Achong	894	3.86%	−59.18%
Margin of victory		3,396	14.68%	−24.85%
Turnout		23,132	88.88%	−4.71%
Registered electors		26,369		4.42%
FPM gain from NCP		Swing	-4.47%	

=== 2000 Assembly election ===
2000 Manipur Legislative Assembly election: Kangpokpi
Party	Candidate	Votes	%	±%
NCP	Thangminlen Kipgen	14,565	63.04%	
INC	Ranjit Gurung	5,432	23.51%	3.96%
BJP	Hari Prasad Nepal	3,010	13.03%	
Margin of victory		9,133	39.53%	29.43%
Turnout		23,103	92.13%	−1.46%
Registered electors		25,253		13.18%
NCP gain from MPP		Swing	18.52%	

=== 1995 Assembly election ===
1995 Manipur Legislative Assembly election: Kangpokpi
Party	Candidate	Votes	%	±%
MPP	Thangminlen	9,134	44.52%	24.16%
SAP	Kishore Thapa	7,062	34.42%	
INC	L. S. John	4,011	19.55%	3.77%
Independent	Solomon Veino	308	1.50%	
Margin of victory		2,072	10.10%	9.95%
Turnout		20,515	93.59%	1.41%
Registered electors		22,312		9.37%
MPP gain from JD		Swing	20.06%	

=== 1990 Assembly election ===
1990 Manipur Legislative Assembly election: Kangpokpi
Party	Candidate	Votes	%	±%
JD	L. S. John	4,529	24.46%	
INS(SCS)	Shehkhogin Pagin Kipgen	4,502	24.32%	
MPP	Tongkhohao Hangshing	3,770	20.36%	
INC	Kishore Thapa	2,922	15.78%	4.65%
Independent	Hari Prasad Nepal	2,367	12.78%	
Independent	Apao Chongloi	311	1.68%	
Margin of victory		27	0.15%	−19.27%
Turnout		18,515	92.18%	−1.69%
Registered electors		20,400		18.60%
JD gain from Independent		Swing	-18.08%	

=== 1984 Assembly election ===
1984 Manipur Legislative Assembly election: Kangpokpi
Party	Candidate	Votes	%	±%
Independent	Kishore Thapa	6,782	42.54%	
Independent	Thangminlen Kipgen	3,686	23.12%	
Independent	Seikam	3,582	22.47%	
INC	Padma Prasad Kharel	1,774	11.13%	
Margin of victory		3,096	19.42%	0.35%
Turnout		15,942	93.87%	4.30%
Registered electors		17,200		33.98%
Independent gain from INC(I)		Swing	-5.62%	

=== 1980 Assembly election ===
1980 Manipur Legislative Assembly election: Kangpokpi
Party	Candidate	Votes	%	±%
INC(I)	Kishore Thapa	5,353	48.16%	
Independent	Taokhosli Kipgen	3,233	29.09%	
Independent	Paokhothang	2,335	21.01%	
JP	Ram Prasad	194	1.75%	
Margin of victory		2,120	19.07%	9.10%
Turnout		11,115	89.56%	7.18%
Registered electors		12,838		11.10%
INC(I) gain from INC		Swing	-6.83%	

=== 1974 Assembly election ===
1974 Manipur Legislative Assembly election: Kangpokpi
Party	Candidate	Votes	%	±%
INC	Kishore Thapa	5,029	54.99%	
KNA	Paokhosei	4,117	45.01%	
Margin of victory		912	9.97%	
Turnout		9,146	82.38%	
Registered electors		11,555		
INC win (new seat)				

== See also ==
- Kangpokpi
- List of constituencies of Manipur Legislative Assembly
- Senapati district
