= 2002 elections in India =

Elections in India
- 2002

Elections in the Republic of India in 2002 included elections to seven state legislative assemblies and the elections for the posts of President and vice-president.

== Results ==
Date(s)	State	Government before election	Chief Minister before election	Government after election	Chief Minister after election	Maps
13 February 2002	Punjab	Shiromani Akali Dal	Parkash Singh Badal	Indian National Congress	Amarinder Singh	
14 to 21 February 2002	Manipur	President's Rule		Indian National Congress	Okram Ibobi Singh	
14 February 2002	Uttarakhand	Bharatiya Janata Party	Bhagat Singh Koshyari	Indian National Congress	N. D. Tiwari	
March 2002	Uttar Pradesh	Bharatiya Janata Party	Rajnath Singh	Bahujan Samaj Party	Mayawati	
March 2002	Uttar Pradesh	breakaway factions of INC and BSP and other small parties.	Rajnath Singh	Bharatiya Janata Party	Mayawati	
30 May 2002	Goa	Bharatiya Janata Party	Manohar Parrikar	Bharatiya Janata Party	Manohar Parrikar	
30 May 2002	Goa	Maharashtrawadi Gomantak Party	Manohar Parrikar	Maharashtrawadi Gomantak Party	Manohar Parrikar	
16 September 2002 to 8 October 2002	Jammu and Kashmir	Jammu and Kashmir National Conference	Farooq Abdullah	Jammu and Kashmir People's Democratic Party	Mufti Mohammad Sayeed	
16 September 2002 to 8 October 2002	Jammu and Kashmir	Jammu and Kashmir National Conference	Farooq Abdullah	Indian National Congress	Mufti Mohammad Sayeed	
12 December 2002	Gujarat	Bharatiya Janata Party	Narendra Modi	Bharatiya Janata Party	Narendra Modi	

== Legislative Assembly elections ==
=== Goa ===
Rank	Party	Seats Contested	Seats Won
1	Bharatiya Janata Party	39	17
2	Indian National Congress	40	16
4	United Goans Democratic Party	10	3
3	Maharashtrawadi Gomantak	25	2
5	Nationalist Congress Party	20	1
6	Independent	48	1
	Total		40

=== Gujarat ===
Party	Seats won
Bharatiya Janata Party	127
Indian National Congress	51
Janata Dal (United)	2
Independents	2

=== Jammu & Kashmir ===
Summary of the Jammu and Kashmir state assembly election results
Party	Seats	Previously	+/–	Vote %	Vote Share
National Conference	28	57	▼29	28.24%	7,49,825
Indian National Congress	20	7	▲13	24.24%	6,43,751
People's Democratic Party	16	-	▲16	9.28%	2,46,480
Jammu & Kashmir National Panthers Party	4	1	▲3	3.83%	1,01,830
Communist Party of India (Marxist)	2		0	0.88%	23493
Bharatiya Janata Party	1	8	▼7	8.57%	2,27,633
Bahujan Samaj Party	1	4	▼3	4.50%	1,19,492
Democratic Movement	1			0.62%	16,366
Jammu and Kashmir Awami League	1	1	0	0.91%	24,121
Independents	13			16.50%	4,38,287
Total (turnout 43.70%)	87	87		-	-
Valid votes		26,55,570	99.90		
Invalid votes		584	0.10		
Votes cast / turnout		26,56,627	43.70		
Abstentions		24,94,170	56.30%		
Registered voters		60,78,570			
Source:Election Commission of India

=== Manipur ===
Party	Votes	%	Seats	+/–
Indian National Congress	345,660	26.18	20	+9
Federal Party of Manipur	239,444	18.14	13	+7
Manipur State Congress Party	163,758	12.40	7	–16
Bharatiya Janata Party	126,044	9.55	4	–2
Nationalist Congress Party	124,583	9.44	3	–2
Samata Party	109,912	8.33	3	+2
Communist Party of India	58,102	4.40	5	+5
Democratic Revolutionary Peoples Party	51,916	3.93	2	+2
Manipur National Conference	53,146	4.03	1	New
Manipur Peoples Party	40,006	3.03	2	–2
Janata Dal (United)	2,070	0.16	0	–1
Naga National Party	630	0.05	0	New
Communist Party of India (Marxist)	340	0.03	0	0
Samajwadi Janata Party (Rashtriya)	166	0.01	0	New
Lok Shakti	45	0.00	0	New
Independents	4,343	0.33	0	–1
Total	1,320,165	100.00	60	0
Valid votes	1,320,165	99.23		
Invalid/blank votes	10,294	0.77		
Total votes	1,330,459	100.00		
Registered voters/turnout	1,472,919	90.33		
Source: ECI

=== Punjab ===
Summary of results of the Punjab Legislative Assembly election, 2002
Political Party	No. of Candidates	Seats won	Number of Votes	% of Votes
Indian National Congress	105	62	3,682,877	35.81%
Shiromani Akali Dal	92	41	3,196,924	31.08%
Bharatiya Janata Party	23	3	583,214	5.67%
Communist Party of India	11	2	220,785	2.15%
Independents	274	9	1,159,552	11.27%
Total	923	117	10,284,686	

=== Uttar Pradesh ===
Party name	Seats
Samajwadi Party	143
Bahujan Samaj Party	98
Indian National Congress	25
Bharatiya Janata Party	88
Communist Party of India (Marxist)	2
Janata Dal (United)	2
Akhil Bharat Hindu Mahasabha	1
Akhil Bharatiya Loktantrik Congress	2
Apna Dal	3
National Loktantrik Party	1
Rashtriya Lok Dal	14
Rashtriya Parivartan Dal	1
Rashtriya Kranti Party	4
Samajwadi Janata Party (Rashtriya)	1
Independents	16
Total	403
Elections.in EIC

=== Uttarakhand ===
Rank	Party	Seats Contested	Seats Won	% Votes	% Votes in Seats Contested	Leader in the House
1	Indian National Congress (INC)	70	36	26.91%	26.91%	Narayan Datt Tiwari
2	Bharatiya Janata Party (BJP)	69	19	25.45%	25.81%	Matbar Singh Kandari
3	Bahujan Samaj Party (BSP)	68	07	10.93%	11.20%	Narayan Pal
4	Uttarakhand Kranti Dal (UKD)	62	04	5.49%	6.36%	Kashi Singh Airy
5	Nationalist Congress Party (NCP)	26	01	1.50%	4.02%	Balvir Singh Negi
6	Independents	–	03	16.30%	16.63%	N/A
	Total	–	70	–	–	

== Presidential election ==
An election was held on 15 July 2002 to elect the President of India. On 18 July 2002, the results were declared. A. P. J. Abdul Kalam became the 11th President by beating his nearest rival Lakshmi Sahgal.

States	No. of MLA/MPs	Value of each Vote	Total (Votes)	Total (Values)	A. P. J. Abdul Kalam (Votes)	A. P. J. Abdul Kalam (Values)	Lakshmi Sahgal (Votes)	Lakshmi Sahgal (Values)	Invalid (Votes)	Invalid (Values)	Valid (Votes)	Valid (Values)
Members of Parliament	776	708	760	538,080	638	451,704	80	56,640	42	29,736	718	50,8344
Andhra Pradesh	294	148	283	41,884	264	39,072	2	296	17	2,516	266	39,368
Arunachal Pradesh	60	8	57	456	57	456	0	0	0	0	57	456
Assam	126	116	119	13,804	113	13,108	1	116	5	580	114	13,224
Bihar	243	173	234	40,482	215	37,195	17	2,941	2	346	232	40,136
Chhattisgarh	90	129	90	11,610	85	10,965	0	0	5	645	85	10,965
Goa	40	20	39	780	34	680	3	60	2	40	37	740
Gujarat	182	147	179	26,313	174	25,578	2	294	3	441	176	25,872
Haryana	90	112	86	9,632	86	9,632	0	0	0	0	86	9,632
Himachal Pradesh	68	51	64	3,264	62	3,162	1	51	1	51	63	3,213
Jammu and Kashmir	87	72	78	5,616	72	5,184	2	144	4	288	74	5,328
Jharkhand	81	176	79	13,904	74	13,024	5	880	0	0	79	13,904
Karnataka	224	131	220	28,820	202	26,462	13	1,703	5	655	215	28,165
Kerala	140	152	138	20,976	97	14,744	39	5,928	2	304	136	20,672
Madhya Pradesh	230	131	229	29,999	216	28,296	2	262	11	1,441	218	28,558
Maharashtra	288	175	280	49,000	264	46,200	9	1,575	7	1,225	273	47,775
Manipur	60	18	58	1,044	50	900	4	72	4	72	54	972
Meghalaya	60	17	56	952	53	901	1	17	2	34	54	918
Mizoram	40	8	40	320	40	320	0	0	0	0	42	320
Nagaland	60	9	60	540	54	486	0	0	6	54	54	486
Orissa	147	149	146	21,754	130	19,370	12	1,788	4	596	142	21,158
Punjab	117	116	110	12,760	87	10,092	9	1,044	14	1,624	96	1,1136
Rajasthan	200	129	197	25,413	189	24,381	2	258	6	774	191	24,639
Sikkim	32	7	32	224	30	210	0	0	2	14	30	210
Tamil Nadu	234	176	233	41,111	217	38,192	10	1,760	6	1,056	227	39,952
Tripura	60	26	60	1,560	17	442	41	1,066	2	52	58	1,508
Uttarakhand	70	64	69	4,416	63	4,032	3	192	3	192	66	4,224
Uttar Pradesh	403	208	397	82,576	386	80,288	2	416	9	1,872	388	80,704
West Bengal	294	151	292	44,092	90	13,590	197	29,747	5	755	287	43,337
Delhi	70	58	70	4,060	65	3,770	2	116	3	174	67	3,886
Pondicherry	147	127	145	18,415	147	448	0	0	2	32	28	448
TOTALS	4,896		4,785	1,075,819	4,152	922,884	459	107,366	174	45,569	4,611	1,030,250
Source: Election Commission of India

== Vice-Presidential election ==
An election was held on 12 August 2002 to elect the newly vacated post of Vice-President of India. Bhairon Singh Shekhawat defeated Sushil Kumar Shinde to become 11th Vice President of India. Incumbent VP Krishan Kant did not contest the election and died before the election occurred.

Result of the Indian vice-presidential election, 2002
Candidate	Party	Electoral Votes	% of Votes
Bhairon Singh Shekhawat	BJP	454	59.82
Sushil Kumar Shinde	INC	305	40.18
Total		759	100.00
Valid Votes		759	99.09
Invalid Votes		7	0.91
Turnout		766	96.96
Abstentions		24	3.04
Electors		790	
