= Mao Assembly constituency =

Legislative Assembly constituency in Manipur State, India

Coordinates: 25.51°N 94.14°E

Mao
- Constituency No. 48 for the Manipur Legislative Assembly

Constituency details
- Country: India
- Region: Northeast India
- State: Manipur
- District: Senapati
- Lok Sabha constituency: Outer Manipur
- Established: 1967
- Total electors: 55,735
- Reservation: ST

Member of Legislative Assembly
- 12th Manipur Legislative Assembly
- Incumbent Losii Dikho
- Party: NPF
- Alliance: NDA
- Elected year: 2022

Mao is one of the constituencies in Manipur Legislative Assembly constituencies in Manipur. It has the second-highest number of voters among all the constituencies in Manipur.

It is part of Senapati district and is reserved for candidates belonging to the Scheduled Tribes.

== Members of the Legislative Assembly ==
Year	Member	Party
1967	Shoukhothang	Independent politician
1967 Mao West	Soso Lorho	Indian National Congress
1972	Asosu Ashiho	Indian National Congress
1974	Kh. Thekho	Manipur Hills Union
1980	Soso Lorho	Indian National Congress
1984	Lorho	Indian National Congress
1990	Lorho	Indian National Congress
1995	M. Thohrii	Indian Congress
2000	M. Thohrii	Indian National Congress
2002	R. K. Thekho	Indian National Congress
2007	M. Thohrii	Independent politician
2012	Losii Dikho	Naga People's Front
2017	Losii Dikho	Naga People's Front
2022	Losii Dikho	Naga People's Front

== Election results ==
Vote share of winning candidates
2022	58.05%
2017	52.69%
2012	48.24%
2007	41.81%
2002	30.58%
2000	58.85%
1995	62.95%
1990	32.87%
1984	34.03%
1980	36.09%
1974	26.76%
1972	36.35%
1967	52.87%

=== 2027 Assembly election ===
2027 Manipur Legislative Assembly election: Mao
Party	Candidate	Votes	%	±%
INC				
NDA				
NOTA	None of the above			
Majority				
Turnout				
gain from		Swing		

=== Assembly Election 2022 ===
2022 Manipur Legislative Assembly election: Mao
Party	Candidate	Votes	%	±%
NPF	Losii Dikho	29,591	58.05%	5.36%
Independent	Woba Joram	21,078	41.35%	
BJP	Sanii Alexander Maikho	279	0.55%	−20.83%
Margin of victory		8,513	16.70%	−14.62%
Turnout		50,974	91.46%	0.05%
Registered electors		55,735		3.52%
NPF hold		Swing	5.36%	

=== Assembly Election 2017 ===
2017 Manipur Legislative Assembly election: Mao
Party	Candidate	Votes	%	±%
NPF	Losii Dikho	25,933	52.69%	4.45%
BJP	Woba Joram	10,519	21.37%	
INC	P. T. Arhai	7,604	15.45%	−12.88%
Independent	R. Haba Pao	5,101	10.36%	
Margin of victory		15,414	31.32%	11.41%
Turnout		49,216	91.41%	5.76%
Registered electors		53,841		2.83%
NPF hold		Swing	4.45%	

=== Assembly Election 2012 ===
2012 Manipur Legislative Assembly election: Mao
Party	Candidate	Votes	%	±%
NPF	Losii Dikho	21,634	48.24%	
INC	P. T. Arhai	12,704	28.33%	
AITC	Woba Joram	10,508	23.43%	
Margin of victory		8,930	19.91%	5.94%
Turnout		44,847	85.65%	5.64%
Registered electors		52,360		6.03%
NPF gain from Independent		Swing	6.42%	

=== Assembly Election 2007 ===
2007 Manipur Legislative Assembly election: Mao
Party	Candidate	Votes	%	±%
Independent	M. Thohrii	16,521	41.81%	
Independent	Woba Joram	11,000	27.84%	
Independent	S. Kho John	6,358	16.09%	
Independent	Th. Sokho George	5,443	13.78%	
Margin of victory		5,521	13.97%	12.94%
Turnout		39,510	80.01%	−18.10%
Registered electors		49,383		10.46%
Independent gain from INC		Swing	11.24%	

=== Assembly Election 2002 ===
2002 Manipur Legislative Assembly election: Mao
Party	Candidate	Votes	%	±%
INC	R. K. Thekho	13,387	30.58%	−28.28%
FPM	Soso Lorho	12,936	29.55%	24.90%
SAP	M. Thohrii	10,628	24.28%	22.89%
BJP	N. Loli Mao	6,755	15.43%	
Margin of victory		451	1.03%	−22.71%
Turnout		43,781	98.10%	−0.38%
Registered electors		44,706		4.92%
INC hold		Swing	-32.38%	

=== Assembly Election 2000 ===
2000 Manipur Legislative Assembly election: Mao
Party	Candidate	Votes	%	±%
INC	M. Thohrii	23,149	58.85%	21.87%
MSCP	Soso Lorho	13,813	35.12%	
FPM	N. Loli	1,827	4.64%	
SAP	Asoso Yonuo	544	1.38%	
Margin of victory		9,336	23.74%	−2.23%
Turnout		39,333	92.49%	−5.99%
Registered electors		42,608		17.96%
INC gain from IC(S)		Swing	-4.10%	

=== Assembly Election 1995 ===
1995 Manipur Legislative Assembly election: Mao
Party	Candidate	Votes	%	±%
IC(S)	M. Thohrii	22,310	62.95%	
INC	S. Lorho	13,108	36.99%	4.12%
Margin of victory		9,202	25.97%	23.29%
Turnout		35,439	98.48%	0.23%
Registered electors		36,121		11.29%
IC(S) gain from INC		Swing	30.08%	

=== Assembly Election 1990 ===
1990 Manipur Legislative Assembly election: Mao
Party	Candidate	Votes	%	±%
INC	Lorho	10,425	32.87%	−1.16%
INS(SCS)	M. Thohrii	9,576	30.19%	
JD	Kh. Thekho	9,212	29.05%	
MPP	N. Loli	2,502	7.89%	
Margin of victory		849	2.68%	2.09%
Turnout		31,715	98.25%	6.21%
Registered electors		32,457		28.97%
INC hold		Swing	-1.16%	

=== Assembly Election 1984 ===
1984 Manipur Legislative Assembly election: Mao
Party	Candidate	Votes	%	±%
INC	Lorho	7,841	34.03%	
Independent	Puni Beso	7,705	33.44%	
Independent	Kh. Thekho	4,420	19.18%	
Independent	James P. Lokho	2,966	12.87%	
Margin of victory		136	0.59%	−6.32%
Turnout		23,039	92.04%	2.07%
Registered electors		25,167		16.63%
INC gain from INC(I)		Swing	-2.06%	

=== Assembly Election 1980 ===
1980 Manipur Legislative Assembly election: Mao
Party	Candidate	Votes	%	±%
INC(I)	Soso Lorho	6,897	36.09%	
JP	Kh. Thekho	5,576	29.18%	
Independent	Mahrili Ashiho	5,315	27.81%	
Independent	Sibo Lorho	1,322	6.92%	
Margin of victory		1,321	6.91%	5.83%
Turnout		19,110	89.97%	−4.67%
Registered electors		21,578		43.69%
INC(I) gain from Manipur Hills Union		Swing	9.33%	

=== Assembly Election 1974 ===
1974 Manipur Legislative Assembly election: Mao
Party	Candidate	Votes	%	±%
Manipur Hills Union	Kh. Thekho	3,764	26.76%	
INC	Lohrii	3,612	25.68%	−10.67%
Independent	Kollo Kaiho	3,533	25.12%	
Independent	James Lokho Kolakhe	3,156	22.44%	
Margin of victory		152	1.08%	−2.63%
Turnout		14,065	94.65%	30.24%
Registered electors		15,017		53.44%
Manipur Hills Union gain from INC		Swing	-9.59%	

=== Assembly Election 1972 ===
1972 Manipur Legislative Assembly election: Mao
Party	Candidate	Votes	%	±%
INC	Asosu Ashiho	2,242	36.35%	
Independent	James Lokho Kolakhe	2,013	32.64%	
MPP	Sibo Larho	1,913	31.01%	
Margin of victory		229	3.71%	−3.52%
Turnout		6,168	64.40%	53.05%
Registered electors		9,787		−32.27%
INC gain from Independent		Swing	-16.52%	

=== Assembly Election 1967 ===
1967 Manipur Legislative Assembly election: Mao West
Party	Candidate	Votes	%	±%
INC	S. Lorho	Unopposed		
Margin of victory				
Turnout				
Registered electors		13,054		
INC win (new seat)				

=== Assembly Election 1967 ===
1967 Manipur Legislative Assembly election : Mao
Party	Candidate	Votes	%	±%
Independent	Shoukhothang	848	52.87%	
Independent	S. Larbo	732	45.64%	
Independent	L. Kipgen	24	1.50%	
Margin of victory		116	7.23%	
Turnout		1,604	11.36%	
Registered electors		14,450		
Independent win (new seat)				

== See also ==
- List of constituencies of the Manipur Legislative Assembly
- Senapati district
