= Thoubal Assembly constituency =

Legislative Assembly constituency in Manipur State, India

Coordinates: 24.54°N 93.97°E

Thoubal
- Constituency No. 31 for the Manipur Legislative Assembly

Constituency details
- Country: India
- Region: Northeast India
- State: Manipur
- District: Thoubal
- Lok Sabha constituency: Inner Manipur
- Established: 1967
- Total electors: 32,132
- Reservation: None

Member of Legislative Assembly
- 12th Manipur Legislative Assembly
- Incumbent Okram Ibobi Singh
- Party: INC
- Alliance: MPSA

Thoubal Legislative Assembly constituency is one of the 60 Legislative Assembly constituencies of Manipur state in India.

It is part of Thoubal district.

== Extent ==
Thoubal is the 31st among 60 constituencies of Manipur. It consists of 40 parts namely: 1 - Moijing Leingoijil, 2 - Moijing Thoubalmayum Leikai, 3 - Moijing Awang Leikai, 4 - Moijing Awang Mamang Leikai, 5 - Moijing Wangmataba Makha Leikai, 6 - Moijing Wangmataba, 7 - Leishangthem (A), 8 - Leishangthem (B), 9 - Leishangthem Khongmanung Maning Leikai, 10 - Leishangthem Keli Makhong (A), 11 - Leishangthem Keli Makhong (B), 12 - Leishangthem Wangmataba (A), 13 - Leishangthem Wangmataba (B), 14 - Thoudam Thokchom, 15 - Nongangkhong (A), 16 - Nongangkhong (B), 17 - Nongangkhong (C), 18 - Okram Wangmataba (A), 19 - Okram Wangmataba (B), 20 - Thoubal Wangmataba(A), 21 - Thoubal Wangmataba(B), 22 - Thoubal Wangmataba(C), 23 - Sabaltongba (1), 24 - Sabaltongba (2-A), 25 - Sabaltongba (2-B), 26 - Okram Hanjaba (A), 27 - Okram Hanjaba (B), 28 - Okram Hanjaba Thongju Leikai, 29 - Okram Hanjaba (C), 30 - Kshetri Leikai (A), 31 - Kshetri Leikai (B), 32 - Kshetri Leikai (C), 33 - Thoubal Achouba Awang Leikai (A), 34 - Thoubal Achouba Awang Leikai (B), 35 - Thoubal Achouba (A), 36 - Thoubal Achouba (B), 37 - Thoubal Achouba Makha Leikai, 38 - Athokpam Town Portion (A), 39 - Athokpam Town Portion (B), and 40 - Thoudam.

== Members of the Legislative Assembly ==
| Year | Member | Party |
|---|---|---|
| 1995 | Leitanthem Tomba Singh | Manipur Peoples Party |
| 2000 | Leitanthem Tomba Singh | Manipur State Congress Party |
| 2002 | Leitanthem Tomba Singh | Federal Party of Manipur |
| 2007 | Okram Ibobi Singh | Indian National Congress |
| 2012 | Okram Ibobi Singh | Indian National Congress |
| 2017 | Okram Ibobi Singh | Indian National Congress |
| 2022 | Okram Ibobi Singh | Indian National Congress |

== Election results ==
Vote share of winning candidates
| 2022 | 51.00% |
| 2017 | 68.38% |
| 2012 | 82.94% |
| 2007 | 72.86% |
| 2002 | 26.45% |
| 2000 | 37.64% |
| 1995 | 60.19% |
| 1984 | 33.83% |
| 1980 | 26.92% |
| 1974 | 29.90% |
| 1972 | 54.68% |
| 1967 | 22.69% |

=== 2027 Assembly election ===
2027 Manipur Legislative Assembly election: Thoubal
| Party | Candidate | Votes | % | ±% |
|---|---|---|---|---|
| INC | | | | |
| NDA | | | | |
| NOTA | None of the above | | | |
| Majority | | | | |
| Turnout | | | | |
| gain from | | Swing | | |

=== Assembly Election 2022 ===
2022 Manipur Legislative Assembly election: Thoubal
| Party | Candidate | Votes | % | ±% |
|---|---|---|---|---|
| INC | Okram Ibobi Singh | 15,085 | 51.00% | −17.39% |
| BJP | Leitanthem Basanta Singh | 12,542 | 42.40% | 12.41% |
| SS | Konsam Michael Singh | 1,622 | 5.48% | |
| NOTA | Nota | 187 | 0.63% | 0.11% |
| Margin of victory | | 2,543 | 8.60% | −29.80% |
| Turnout | | 29,581 | 92.06% | 1.16% |
| Registered electors | | 32,132 | | 7.10% |
| INC hold | | Swing | -17.39% | |

=== Assembly Election 2017 ===
2017 Manipur Legislative Assembly election: Thoubal
| Party | Candidate | Votes | % | ±% |
|---|---|---|---|---|
| INC | Okram Ibobi Singh | 18,649 | 68.38% | −14.56% |
| BJP | Leitanthem Basanta Singh | 8,179 | 29.99% | 14.08% |
| AITC | Leishangthem Suresh Singh | 144 | 0.53% | |
| NOTA | None of the Above | 143 | 0.52% | |
| People's Resurgence and Justice Alliance | Irom Sharmila | 90 | | |
| Margin of victory | | 10,470 | 38.39% | −28.64% |
| Turnout | | 27,271 | 90.90% | 6.25% |
| Registered electors | | 30,002 | | 10.16% |
| INC hold | | Swing | -14.56% | |

=== Assembly Election 2012 ===
2012 Manipur Legislative Assembly election: Thoubal
| Party | Candidate | Votes | % | ±% |
|---|---|---|---|---|
| INC | Okram Ibobi Singh | 19,121 | 82.94% | 10.08% |
| BJP | Oinam Indira | 3,668 | 15.91% | |
| AITC | Dr. A. K. Manglemjao Singh | 257 | 1.11% | |
| Margin of victory | | 15,453 | 67.03% | 20.63% |
| Turnout | | 23,054 | 84.62% | −6.90% |
| Registered electors | | 27,236 | | 4.44% |
| INC hold | | Swing | 10.08% | |

=== Assembly Election 2007 ===
2007 Manipur Legislative Assembly election: Thoubal
| Party | Candidate | Votes | % | ±% |
|---|---|---|---|---|
| INC | Okram Ibobi Singh | 17,393 | 72.86% | 49.90% |
| MPP | Leitanthem Tomba Singh | 6,316 | 26.46% | 3.71% |
| Independent | Dr. Akoijam Manglemjao Singh | 162 | 0.68% | |
| Margin of victory | | 11,077 | 46.40% | 42.92% |
| Turnout | | 23,872 | 91.54% | −0.74% |
| Registered electors | | 26,078 | | 14.77% |
| INC gain from FPM | | Swing | 46.41% | |

=== Assembly Election 2002 ===
2002 Manipur Legislative Assembly election: Thoubal
| Party | Candidate | Votes | % | ±% |
|---|---|---|---|---|
| FPM | Leitanthem Tomba Singh | 5,502 | 26.45% | |
| INC | Tourangbam Mukesh Singh | 4,777 | 22.96% | 2.37% |
| MPP | Md. Abdul Rouf | 4,733 | 22.75% | −1.09% |
| NCP | Irom Chaoba | 3,499 | 16.82% | |
| MSCP | Akoijam Manglemjao | 2,291 | 11.01% | −26.62% |
| Margin of victory | | 725 | 3.49% | −10.31% |
| Turnout | | 20,802 | 92.28% | −2.49% |
| Registered electors | | 22,722 | | 4.49% |
| FPM gain from MSCP | | Swing | -33.74% | |

=== Assembly Election 2000 ===
2000 Manipur Legislative Assembly election: Thoubal
| Party | Candidate | Votes | % | ±% |
|---|---|---|---|---|
| MSCP | Leitanthem Tomba Singh | 7,527 | 37.64% | |
| MPP | Abdul Rouf | 4,768 | 23.84% | −36.35% |
| INC | Mukhes Tourangbam | 4,118 | 20.59% | −5.44% |
| JD(S) | Thoudam Krishna Singh | 3,550 | 17.75% | |
| Margin of victory | | 2,759 | 13.80% | −20.37% |
| Turnout | | 19,999 | 92.84% | −1.93% |
| Registered electors | | 21,745 | | 9.23% |
| MSCP gain from MPP | | Swing | -22.55% | |

=== Assembly Election 1995 ===
1995 Manipur Legislative Assembly election: Thoubal
| Party | Candidate | Votes | % | ±% |
|---|---|---|---|---|
| MPP | Leitanthem Tomba Singh | 11,239 | 60.19% | |
| INC | Thoudam Krishna Singh | 4,860 | 26.03% | |
| CPI | Puyam Khogendro | 1,589 | 8.51% | |
| SAP | Tourangbam Mukesh Singh | 946 | 5.07% | |
| Margin of victory | | 6,379 | 34.16% | |
| Turnout | | 18,673 | 94.77% | |
| Registered electors | | 19,907 | | |
| MPP win (new seat) | | | | |

=== Assembly Election 1984 ===
1984 Manipur Legislative Assembly election: Thoubal
| Party | Candidate | Votes | % | ±% |
|---|---|---|---|---|
| JP | Leitanthem Tomba Singh | 5,316 | 33.83% | |
| INC | Thoudam Krishna Singh | 4,050 | 25.77% | |
| MPP | Akoijam Ibomcha | 3,247 | 20.66% | −6.26% |
| Independent | Aribam Shantikishore | 2,941 | 18.72% | |
| IC(S) | Akoijam Jugeshwar | 160 | 1.02% | |
| Margin of victory | | 1,266 | 8.06% | 7.56% |
| Turnout | | 15,714 | 88.16% | −1.41% |
| Registered electors | | 18,324 | | 17.03% |
| JP gain from MPP | | Swing | 6.91% | |

=== Assembly Election 1980 ===
1980 Manipur Legislative Assembly election: Thoubal
| Party | Candidate | Votes | % | ±% |
|---|---|---|---|---|
| MPP | Thodam Krishna | 3,701 | 26.92% | −2.97% |
| INC(U) | Akoijam Ibomcha | 3,633 | 26.43% | |
| JP(S) | Aribam Shantikishore | 3,053 | 22.21% | |
| JP | Koijam Mangi Singh | 1,717 | 12.49% | |
| INC(I) | Akoijam Birendra | 1,007 | 7.33% | |
| Independent | Thangjam Jatra | 636 | 4.63% | |
| Margin of victory | | 68 | 0.49% | −1.36% |
| Turnout | | 13,747 | 89.58% | −2.30% |
| Registered electors | | 15,658 | | 25.15% |
| MPP hold | | Swing | -2.97% | |

=== Assembly Election 1974 ===
1974 Manipur Legislative Assembly election: Thoubal
| Party | Candidate | Votes | % | ±% |
|---|---|---|---|---|
| MPP | Koijam Mangi Singh | 3,366 | 29.90% | −24.78% |
| Independent | Thoudam Krishna Singh | 3,157 | 28.04% | |
| INC | Ajkoijam Ibomecha Singh | 2,841 | 25.23% | 2.20% |
| Independent | Aribam Shantikishore | 1,850 | 16.43% | |
| Margin of victory | | 209 | 1.86% | −29.79% |
| Turnout | | 11,259 | 91.88% | 4.64% |
| Registered electors | | 12,511 | | 35.27% |
| MPP hold | | Swing | -24.78% | |

=== Assembly Election 1972 ===
1972 Manipur Legislative Assembly election: Thoubal
| Party | Candidate | Votes | % | ±% |
|---|---|---|---|---|
| MPP | Langpoklakpam Chadyaima | 4,290 | 54.68% | |
| INC | Waikhom Mani | 1,807 | 23.03% | 0.35% |
| Independent | Thangjam Jatra | 830 | 10.58% | |
| Independent | Akoijamu Bomcha | 706 | 9.00% | |
| CPI(M) | Naorem Kala | 213 | 2.71% | −0.49% |
| Margin of victory | | 2,483 | 31.65% | 28.59% |
| Turnout | | 7,846 | 87.24% | 3.73% |
| Registered electors | | 9,249 | | −42.62% |
| MPP gain from INC | | Swing | 31.99% | |

=== Assembly Election 1967 ===
1967 Manipur Legislative Assembly election: Thoubal
| Party | Candidate | Votes | % | ±% |
|---|---|---|---|---|
| INC | Waikhom Mani | 2,943 | 22.69% | |
| Independent | L. Chaoyaima | 2,546 | 19.63% | |
| Independent | A. Ibomcha | 2,408 | 18.56% | |
| Independent | S. Chourjit | 1,673 | 12.90% | |
| Independent | K. I. Singh | 1,489 | 11.48% | |
| Independent | W. Nimaichand | 1,418 | 10.93% | |
| CPI(M) | Naorem Kala | 416 | 3.21% | |
| PSP | A. Jugeswor | 80 | 0.62% | |
| Margin of victory | | 397 | 3.06% | |
| Turnout | | 12,973 | 83.51% | |
| Registered electors | | 16,120 | | |
| INC win (new seat) | | | | |

== See also ==
- List of constituencies of the Manipur Legislative Assembly
- Thoubal district
