= 1995 Manipur Legislative Assembly election =

Legislative Assembly election in Manipur, India

- 16 and 19 February 1995

Al 60 seats in the Manipur Legislative Assembly 31 seats needed for a majority
- Registered: 1,160,690
- Turnout: 91.41%

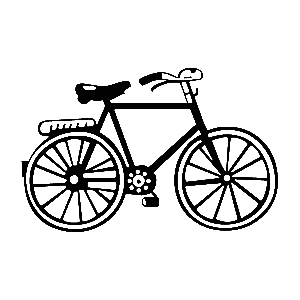
| | Majority party | Minority party |
|---|---|---|
| Leader | Rishang Keishing | Raj Kumar Ranbir Singh |
| Party | INC | MPP |
| Leader's seat | Phungyar | Keishamthong |
| Seats before | 24 | 9 |
| Seats won | 22 | 18 |
| Seat change | ▼2 | ▲9 |
| Popular vote | 28.08% | 23.20% |
CM before election
Rishang Keishing
INC
Elected CM
Rishang Keishing
INC

Elections to the Manipur Legislative Assembly were held in February 1995, to elect members of the 60 constituencies in Manipur, India. The Indian National Congress won the most seats as well as the popular vote, and its leader, Rishang Keishing was re-appointed as the Chief Minister of Manipur.

After the passing of the North-Eastern Areas (Reorganisation) Act, 1971, Manipur was converted from a Union Territory to a State and the size of its Legislative Assembly was increased from 30 to 60 members. The constituencies were changed in 1976 by The Delimitation of Parliamentary and Assembly Constituencies Order, 1976.

== Result ==
| Party | Votes | % | Seats | +/– |
|---|---|---|---|---|
| Indian National Congress | 328,362 | 28.08 | 22 | ▼2 |
| Manipur Peoples Party | 271,247 | 23.20 | 18 | ▲9 |
| Janata Dal | 136,594 | 11.68 | 7 | ▼4 |
| Samata Party | 70,887 | 6.06 | 2 | New |
| Communist Party of India | 64,026 | 5.48 | 2 | ▼1 |
| Federal Party of Manipur | 56,300 | 4.82 | 2 | New |
| Indian Congress (Socialist) | 44,797 | 3.83 | 1 | New |
| Bharatiya Janata Party | 38,405 | 3.28 | 1 | ▲1 |
| Manipur State Congress Party | 30,417 | 2.60 | 2 | ▲1 |
| Samajwadi Janata Party (Rashtriya) | 30,417 | 2.60 | 0 | New |
| Kuki National Assembly | 2,832 | 0.24 | 0 | ▼2 |
| Manipur Hill People's Council | 2,440 | 0.21 | 0 | 0 |
| Communist Party of India (Marxist) | 2,327 | 0.20 | 0 | New |
| Janata Party | 1,611 | 0.14 | 0 | New |
| Independents | 88,526 | 7.57 | 3 | ▲3 |
| Total | 1,169,188 | 100.00 | 60 | ▲6 |
| Valid votes | 1,169,188 | 98.83 | | |
| Invalid/blank votes | 13,868 | 1.17 | | |
| Total votes | 1,183,056 | 100.00 | | |
| Registered voters/turnout | 1,160,690 | 101.93 | | |
Source: ECI

=== Results by constituency ===
Winner, runner-up, voter turnout, and victory margin in every constituency
| Assembly Constituency | | Turnout | Winner | | | | Runner Up | | | | Margin |
| #k | Names | % | Candidate | Party | Votes | % | Candidate | Party | Votes | % | Margin |
|---|---|---|---|---|---|---|---|---|---|---|---|
| 1 | Khundrakpam | 87.39% | Konjengbam Binoy | MPP | 6,440 | 40.61% | Lairellakpam Lala | FPM | 3,341 | 21.07% | 3,099 |
| 2 | Heingang | 93.01% | Wakambam Thoiba | FPM | 6,225 | 33.42% | Yanglem Mangi Singh | Independent | 3,727 | 20.01% | 2,498 |
| 3 | Khurai | 93.31% | Ngairangbam Bijoy Singh | Independent | 5,452 | 27.92% | Laishram Sotinkumar | CPI | 4,901 | 25.10% | 551 |
| 4 | Kshetrigao | 95.55% | Basant Kumar Wangkhem | JD | 7,993 | 38.20% | Muhammuddin Shah | INC | 7,307 | 34.92% | 686 |
| 5 | Thongju | 94.06% | Dr. Sapam Dhananjoy | MPP | 5,829 | 30.10% | Thingujam Chatukini | JD | 5,039 | 26.02% | 790 |
| 6 | Keirao | 96.90% | Hidam Bidur Singh | INC | 4,695 | 26.54% | Chingakham Shyamjai Singh | MPP | 3,095 | 17.49% | 1,600 |
| 7 | Andro | 93.84% | Salam Chandra Singh | MPP | 7,678 | 38.86% | Dr. Angou Singh Chingakham | Independent | 5,376 | 27.21% | 2,302 |
| 8 | Lamlai | 93.69% | Kshetrimayum Biren Singh | MPP | 6,202 | 36.74% | Pheiroijam Parijat Singh | CPI | 5,135 | 30.42% | 1,067 |
| 9 | Thangmeiband | 81.38% | Radhabinod Koijam | INC | 7,666 | 45.63% | Ningthoujam Binoy Singh | SAP | 5,947 | 35.40% | 1,719 |
| 10 | Uripok | 85.77% | N. Nodiachand Singh | MPP | 3,646 | 27.14% | Laishram Nandakumar Singh | FPM | 3,347 | 24.92% | 299 |
| 11 | Sagolband | 83.85% | Moirangthem Kumar Singh | MPP | 5,037 | 33.32% | Dr. Khwairakpam Loken Singh | JD | 3,515 | 23.25% | 1,522 |
| 12 | Keishamthong | 89.16% | Rajkumar Ranbir Singh | MPP | 10,091 | 54.91% | Laishrom Lalit Singh | INC | 7,066 | 38.45% | 3,025 |
| 13 | Singjamei | 87.84% | Irengbam Hemochandra Singh | INC | 5,714 | 40.48% | Haobam Bhubon Singh | BJP | 4,821 | 34.15% | 893 |
| 14 | Yaiskul | 88.81% | Elangbam Kunjeswar Singh | BJP | 5,932 | 35.88% | Gurumayum Joykumar Sharma | MPP | 5,461 | 33.03% | 471 |
| 15 | Wangkhei | 85.34% | Yumkham Erabot Singh | INC | 7,977 | 36.27% | Dr. Haobam Borobabu Singh | MPP | 6,275 | 28.53% | 1,702 |
| 16 | Sekmai | 90.91% | Ningthoujam Biren | INC | 5,197 | 32.41% | Khwirakpam Chaoba | MPP | 4,465 | 27.85% | 732 |
| 17 | Lamsang | 94.86% | Sorokhaibam Rajen Singh | INC | 4,184 | 21.87% | Wangkheimayum Brajabidhu Singh | Independent | 3,857 | 20.17% | 327 |
| 18 | Konthoujam | 93.74% | Henam Lokhon Singh | INC | 6,313 | 34.33% | Heigrujam Thoithoi | MPP | 6,261 | 34.05% | 52 |
| 19 | Patsoi | 91.09% | Dr. Leishangthem Chandramani Singh | INC | 5,787 | 29.03% | N. Muhindro Singh | MPP | 3,742 | 18.77% | 2,045 |
| 20 | Langthabal | 92.22% | Karam Babudhon Singh | INC | 6,674 | 40.76% | O. Joy Singh | MPP | 6,582 | 40.20% | 92 |
| 21 | Naoriya Pakhanglakpa | 94.46% | A. K. Lanngam | Independent | 6,711 | 32.29% | Wahengbam Angou Singh | INC | 5,916 | 28.47% | 795 |
| 22 | Wangoi | 96.90% | W. Nipamacha Singh | INC | 3,868 | 23.43% | Y. Mani Singh | FPM | 3,519 | 21.32% | 349 |
| 23 | Mayang Imphal | 94.93% | Meinam Nilchandra Singh | INC | 5,488 | 31.56% | Amutombi Khumujam Singh | JD | 4,541 | 26.11% | 947 |
| 24 | Nambol | 94.93% | Nameirakpam Loken Singh | MPP | 7,003 | 35.52% | Thounaojam Chaoba Singh | INC | 6,521 | 33.07% | 482 |
| 25 | Oinam | 94.27% | Dr. Yumnam Jiten Singh | MPP | 6,651 | 38.73% | Keisham Apabi Devi | INC | 6,373 | 37.11% | 278 |
| 26 | Bishnupur | 94.97% | Govindas Konthoujam | INC | 3,766 | 20.13% | Khundrakpamjibon Singh | JD | 3,550 | 18.98% | 216 |
| 27 | Moirang | 93.34% | Mohammad Heshamuddin | MPP | 5,586 | 24.70% | Hemam Bir Singh | Independent | 5,204 | 23.01% | 382 |
| 28 | Thanga | 94.00% | Tongbram Mangibabu Singh | JD | 4,277 | 29.57% | Heisnam Sanayaima Singh | INC | 3,414 | 23.60% | 863 |
| 29 | Kumbi | 92.66% | Ningthoujam Mangi | CPI | 4,164 | 23.59% | Sanasam Bira | INC | 3,531 | 20.01% | 633 |
| 30 | Lilong | 93.16% | Md. Helaluddin Khan | INC | 6,371 | 37.06% | Alauddin | MPP | 5,369 | 31.23% | 1,002 |
| 31 | Thoubal | 94.77% | Leitanthem Tomba Singh | MPP | 11,239 | 59.57% | Thoudam Krishna Singh | INC | 4,860 | 25.76% | 6,379 |
| 32 | Wangkhem | 94.06% | Dr. Nimai Chand Luwang | INC | 7,873 | 43.81% | Longjam Ibotomba Singh | MPP | 6,249 | 34.78% | 1,624 |
| 33 | Heirok | 94.01% | Moirangthem Okendro | INC | 6,456 | 36.00% | Nongmeikapam Komol Singh | MPP | 5,258 | 29.32% | 1,198 |
| 34 | Wangjing Tentha | 93.50% | Moirangthem Hemanta Singh | INC | 7,638 | 41.52% | Moirangthem Nara Singh | CPI | 5,925 | 32.20% | 1,713 |
| 35 | Khangabok | 96.60% | Laishram Jatra Singh | MPP | 8,021 | 39.57% | Okram Ibobi Singh | INC | 6,884 | 33.96% | 1,137 |
| 36 | Wabgai | 96.73% | Abdul Salam | MPP | 6,766 | 37.83% | Mayanglambam Manihar Singh | INC | 4,861 | 27.18% | 1,905 |
| 37 | Kakching | 90.89% | Kshetrimayum Irabot Singh | CPI | 6,773 | 39.36% | Nongmaithem Nimai Singh | INC | 6,526 | 37.92% | 247 |
| 38 | Hiyanglam | 93.14% | Maibam Kunjo Singh | JD | 6,817 | 41.44% | Elangbam Biramani Singh | INC | 5,637 | 34.27% | 1,180 |
| 39 | Sugnu | 92.13% | Mayanglambam Babu Singh | JD | 4,404 | 25.11% | Loitongbam Ibomcha Singh | INC | 4,159 | 23.71% | 245 |
| 40 | Jiribam | 83.57% | Th. Debendra | INC | 8,706 | 47.84% | A. Biren Singh | Independent | 8,334 | 45.79% | 372 |
| 41 | Chandel | 94.45% | T.Hangkhanpau | JD | 13,030 | 45.19% | L. Benjamin | FPM | 10,464 | 36.29% | 2,566 |
| 42 | Tengnoupal | 93.52% | Wairok Morung Makunga | INC | 13,058 | 51.99% | Holkhomang Haokip | MPP | 11,423 | 45.48% | 1,635 |
| 43 | Phungyar | 80.51% | Rishang Keishing | INC | 7,467 | 49.99% | Solomon | MPP | 3,328 | 22.28% | 4,139 |
| 44 | Ukhrul | 82.72% | A. S. Arthur | INC | 9,982 | 48.24% | Danny Shaiza | JD | 8,358 | 40.39% | 1,624 |
| 45 | Chingai | 85.59% | Dr. Mashangthei Horam | INC | 8,716 | 37.54% | David N. G. Zimik | SAP | 5,054 | 21.77% | 3,662 |
| 46 | Saikul | 92.44% | Chungkhokai Doungel | MPP | 10,730 | 48.78% | Holkholet Khongsai | INC | 7,302 | 33.19% | 3,428 |
| 47 | Karong | 96.28% | L. Jonathan | SAP | 13,360 | 39.75% | Th. Rapei | MPP | 10,712 | 31.87% | 2,648 |
| 48 | Mao | 98.48% | M. Thohrii | IC(S) | 22,310 | 62.72% | S. Lorho | INC | 13,108 | 36.85% | 9,202 |
| 49 | Tadubi | 93.24% | O. Lohrii | JD | 10,614 | 36.28% | S. Hangzing | IC(S) | 7,303 | 24.97% | 3,311 |
| 50 | Kangpokpi | 93.59% | Thangminlen | MPP | 9,134 | 43.74% | Kishore Thapa | SAP | 7,062 | 33.82% | 2,072 |
| 51 | Saitu | 96.09% | Ngamthang Haokip | MPP | 9,680 | 38.13% | Alar Thoitak | Independent | 7,303 | 28.77% | 2,377 |
| 52 | Tamei | 92.18% | D. P. Panmei | Independent | 5,047 | 24.92% | Mangaibou | MPP | 4,405 | 21.75% | 642 |
| 53 | Tamenglong | 88.07% | Samuel Jendai | SAP | 6,515 | 41.03% | Daisin Pamei | INC | 6,029 | 37.97% | 486 |
| 54 | Nungba | 88.73% | Gangmumei Kamei | FPM | 4,982 | 36.19% | Gaikhangam Gangmei | INC | 4,772 | 34.66% | 210 |
| 55 | Tipaimukh | 87.65% | Dr. Chaltonlian Amo | INC | 5,299 | 47.21% | Selkai Hrangchal | JD | 2,886 | 25.71% | 2,413 |
| 56 | Thanlon | 82.73% | Songchinkhup | MPP | 5,854 | 45.17% | T. Phungzathang | INC | 4,250 | 32.79% | 1,604 |
| 57 | Henglep | 89.66% | Sehpu Haokip | JD | 5,798 | 34.11% | T. Manga Vaiphei | INC | 4,992 | 29.37% | 806 |
| 58 | Churachandpur | 81.33% | V. Hangkhanlian | MPP | 14,641 | 57.81% | K. Vungzalian | MSCP | 6,335 | 25.01% | 8,306 |
| 59 | Saikot | 89.18% | T. N. Haokip | MPP | 8,938 | 30.33% | Ngulkhohao Lhungdim | JD | 7,599 | 25.79% | 1,339 |
| 60 | Singhat | 85.88% | T. Gouzadou | MPP | 6,327 | 36.09% | T. Ngaizanem | MSCP | 5,223 | 29.79% | 1,104 |

== See also ==
- List of constituencies of the Manipur Legislative Assembly
- 1995 elections in India
