= List of constituencies of the Manipur Legislative Assembly =

List of state assembly constituencies in India

Manipur Legislative Assembly
- 12th Manipur Assembly

Type
- Type: Unicameral
- Term limits: 5 years
- Seats: 60

Elections
- Voting system: First past the post
- Last election: 2022
- Next election: 2027

Meeting place
- Capital Complex, Thangmeiband, Imphal, Manipur

Website
- manipurassembly.net

Location of Manipur (in red) within India

The Manipur Legislative Assembly is the unicameral legislature of the state of Manipur in northeast India. Its seat is at Imphal, the capital of the state, and it sits for a term of five years unless it is dissolved early. (Note: A Legislative Assembly can be dissolved early, under Article 174 of the Indian Constitution, in a few situations including a hung assembly and the inability of any alliance to form a majority.) Manipur is India's sixth smallest state by population as well as the sixth smallest by area. The Manipur Legislative Assembly has had 12 terms since its creation. After the latest election in 2022, the assembly is governed by the Bharatiya Janata Party, which has 37 out of the 60 seats. The Indian National Congress, the largest opposition party, has 5 seats. (Note: The National People's Party has more seats than the Congress, but they are allied with the Bharatiya Janata Party.)

Constituency boundaries are periodically redrawn by the delimitation commission which tries to keep them as geographically compact areas, and with due consideration to existing boundaries of administrative units. The latest census is used to draw the boundaries and every assembly constituency has to be completely within a parliamentary constituency. Since 1972, the Manipur Assembly has had 60 single-seat constituencies, each of which directly elects a representative based on a first past the post election.

Since the independence of India from the United Kingdom in 1947, the Scheduled Castes (SC) and Scheduled Tribes (ST) have been given reservation status, guaranteeing political representation, and the Constitution lays down the general principles of positive discrimination for SCs and STs. According to the 2011 census of India the Scheduled Castes constitute 3.8%, while the Scheduled Tribes constitute 35.1% of the population of the state. The Scheduled Castes have been granted a reservation of 1 seat in the assembly, while 19 constituencies are reserved for candidates of the Scheduled Tribes.

== History ==
After the passing of the States Reorganisation Act, 1956 and the Constitution (Seventh Amendment) Act, 1956, Manipur was converted from a Part-C state to a Union Territory but, it wasn't assigned a Legislative Assembly.

Changes in the constituencies of the Manipur Legislative Assembly over time
Year	Act	Effect	Total seats	Reserved seats		Election(s)
Year	Act	Effect	Total seats	SC	ST	Election(s)
1963	Government of Union Territories Act, 1963	The legislative assembly was created with 30 elected seats.	30	0	9	1967
1971	North-Eastern Areas (Reorganisation) Act, 1971	Manipur was converted from a Union Territory to a State. The size of its legislative assembly was increased from 30 to 60 members.	60	1	19	1972, 1974
1976	Delimitation of Parliamentary and Assembly Constituencies Order, 1976	There were changes in the reservation status and area covered by constituencies.	60	1	19	1980, 1984, 1990, 1995, 2000, 2002, 2007, 2012, 2017, 2022

== Constituencies ==
Assembly constituencies of Manipur

Reservation
Scheduled Castes (SC)
Scheduled Tribes (ST)

Constituencies of the Manipur Legislative Assembly
No.	Name	Reservation	District (Note: Districts as per the 2011 census)	Lok Sabha constituency	Electorate (2022)
1	Khundrakpam	None	Imphal East	Inner Manipur	27,777
2	Heingang	None	Imphal East	Inner Manipur	34,177
3	Khurai	None	Imphal East	Inner Manipur	35,747
4	Kshetrigao	None	Imphal East	Inner Manipur	36,835
5	Thongju	None	Imphal East	Inner Manipur	32,132
6	Keirao	None	Imphal East	Inner Manipur	30,224
7	Andro	None	Imphal East	Inner Manipur	35,930
8	Lamlai	None	Imphal East	Inner Manipur	30,376
9	Thangmeiband	None	Imphal West	Inner Manipur	28,212
10	Uripok	None	Imphal West	Inner Manipur	25,727
11	Sagolband	None	Imphal West	Inner Manipur	24,019
12	Keishamthong	None	Imphal West	Inner Manipur	27,536
13	Singjamei	None	Imphal West	Inner Manipur	20,734
14	Yaiskul	None	Imphal East	Inner Manipur	26,794
15	Wangkhei	None	Imphal East	Inner Manipur	37,235
16	Sekmai	SC	Imphal West	Inner Manipur	30,487
17	Lamsang	None	Imphal West	Inner Manipur	33,787
18	Konthoujam	None	Imphal West	Inner Manipur	30,018
19	Patsoi	None	Imphal West	Inner Manipur	37,604
20	Langthabal	None	Imphal West	Inner Manipur	28,413
21	Naoriya Pakhanglakpa	None	Imphal West	Inner Manipur	35,053
22	Wangoi	None	Imphal West	Inner Manipur	30,031
23	Mayang Imphal	None	Imphal West	Inner Manipur	32,053
24	Nambol	None	Bishnupur	Inner Manipur	33,399
25	Oinam	None	Bishnupur	Inner Manipur	28,688
26	Bishnupur	None	Bishnupur	Inner Manipur	32,115
27	Moirang	None	Bishnupur	Inner Manipur	39,876
28	Thanga	None	Bishnupur	Inner Manipur	22,984
29	Kumbi	None	Bishnupur	Inner Manipur	28,161
30	Lilong	None	Thoubal	Inner Manipur	36,006
31	Thoubal	None	Thoubal	Inner Manipur	32,132
32	Wangkhem	None	Thoubal	Inner Manipur	33,866
33	Heirok	None	Thoubal	Outer Manipur	33,098
34	Wangjing Tentha	None	Thoubal	Outer Manipur	33,398
35	Khangabok	None	Thoubal	Outer Manipur	37,687
36	Wabgai	None	Thoubal	Outer Manipur	31,681
37	Kakching	None	Thoubal	Outer Manipur	30,499
38	Hiyanglam	None	Thoubal	Outer Manipur	27,926
39	Sugnu	None	Thoubal	Outer Manipur	28,268
40	Jiribam	None	Imphal East	Outer Manipur	29,426
41	Chandel	ST	Chandel	Outer Manipur	50,378
42	Tengnoupal	ST	Chandel	Outer Manipur	44,914
43	Phungyar	ST	Ukhrul	Outer Manipur	34,789
44	Ukhrul	ST	Ukhrul	Outer Manipur	48,307
45	Chingai	ST	Ukhrul	Outer Manipur	47,449
46	Saikul	ST	Senapati	Outer Manipur	29,417
47	Karong	ST	Senapati	Outer Manipur	54,916
48	Mao	ST	Senapati	Outer Manipur	55,735
49	Tadubi	ST	Senapati	Outer Manipur	49,410
50	Kangpokpi	None	Senapati	Outer Manipur	28,124
51	Saitu	ST	Senapati	Outer Manipur	44,686
52	Tamei	ST	Tamenglong	Outer Manipur	42,117
53	Tamenglong	ST	Tamenglong	Outer Manipur	35,888
54	Nungba	ST	Tamenglong	Outer Manipur	29,510
55	Tipaimukh	ST	Churachandpur	Outer Manipur	18,606
56	Thanlon	ST	Churachandpur	Outer Manipur	18,042
57	Henglep	ST	Churachandpur	Outer Manipur	31,944
58	Churachandpur	ST	Churachandpur	Outer Manipur	65,325
59	Saikot	ST	Churachandpur	Outer Manipur	62,613
60	Singhat	ST	Churachandpur	Outer Manipur	27,832

== See also ==
- List of constituencies of the Nagaland Legislative Assembly
- List of constituencies of the Mizoram Legislative Assembly
