= 2002 Manipur Legislative Assembly election =

Manipur Legislative Assembly election

- 14 and 21 February 2002

All 60 seats in the Manipur Legislative Assembly 31 seats needed for a majority
- Registered: 1,472,919
- Turnout: 90.38%
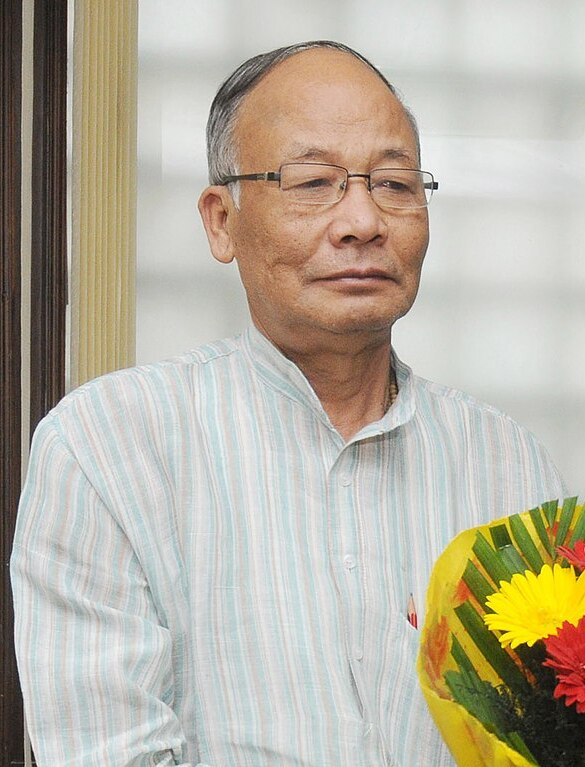

	Majority party	Minority party
Party	INC	MSCP
Seats before	11	23
Seats won	20	07
Seat change	▲09	▼16
Popular vote	26.18%	12.40%
CM before election
President's Rule
Elected CM
Okram Ibobi Singh
INC

Elections to the Manipur Legislative Assembly were held in February 2002, to elect members of the 60 constituencies in Manipur, India. The Indian National Congress won the most seats as well as the popular vote, and Okram Ibobi Singh was appointed as the Chief Minister of Manipur. The Indian National Congress didn't have a majority of seats on its own and joined the Secular Proggresive Front alliance, along with the Communist Party of India, the Nationalist Congress Party and the Manipur State Congress Party.

After the passing of The Delimitation of Parliamentary and Assembly Constituencies Order, 1976, the constituencies were set to the ones used in this election.

== Parties contested ==
Party	Flag	Symbol	Leader	Seats contested
Indian National Congress			Okram Ibobi Singh	58
Federal Party of Manipur			Gangmumei Kamei	48
Bharatiya Janata Party			Jana Krishnamurthi	46
Manipur State Congress Party			Wahengbam Nipamacha Singh	42
Nationalist Congress Party			P. A. Sangma	33
Samata Party			George Fernandes	31
Democratic Revolutionary Peoples Party			N. Biren Singh	23
Manipur National Conference			Th. Chaoba	23
Communist Party of India			A. B. Bardhan	16
Manipur People's Party				14
Janata Dal (United)			Nitish Kumar	7
Nagaland People's Party				5
Lok Shakti			Ramakrishna Hegde	3
Communist Party of India (Marxist)			Prakash Karat	1
Samajwadi Janata Party (Rashtriya)			Chandrashekhar	1

== Results ==
Party	Votes	%	Seats	+/–
Indian National Congress	345,660	26.18	20	▲9
Federal Party of Manipur	239,444	18.14	13	▲7
Manipur State Congress Party	163,758	12.40	7	▼16
Bharatiya Janata Party	126,044	9.55	4	▼2
Nationalist Congress Party	124,583	9.44	3	▼2
Samata Party	109,912	8.33	3	▲2
Communist Party of India	58,102	4.40	5	▲5
Democratic Revolutionary Peoples Party	51,916	3.93	2	▲2
Manipur National Conference	53,146	4.03	1	New
Manipur Peoples Party	40,006	3.03	2	▼2
Janata Dal (United)	2,070	0.16	0	▼1
Naga National Party	630	0.05	0	New
Communist Party of India (Marxist)	340	0.03	0	0
Samajwadi Janata Party (Rashtriya)	166	0.01	0	New
Lok Shakti	45	0.00	0	New
Independents	4,343	0.33	0	▼1
Total	1,320,165	100.00	60	0
Valid votes	1,320,165	99.23		
Invalid/blank votes	10,294	0.77		
Total votes	1,330,459	100.00		
Registered voters/turnout	1,472,919	90.33		
Source: ECI

=== Results by constituency ===
Winner, runner-up, voter turnout, and victory margin in every constituency
Assembly Constituency		Turnout	Winner				Runner Up				Margin
#k	Names	%	Candidate	Party	Votes	%	Candidate	Party	Votes	%	Margin
1	Khundrakpam	86.34%	Lairellakpam Lala	SAP	3,258	19.10%	Konsam Tomba	FPM	2,824	16.56%	434
2	Heingang	89.00%	N. Biren Singh	DRPP	5,869	28.86%	Yanglem Mangi Singh	MSCP	5,621	27.64%	248
3	Khurai	88.25%	Ningthoujam Bihari Singh	FPM	7,417	34.75%	Laishram Sotinkumar	CPI	6,120	28.67%	1,297
4	Kshetrigao	90.95%	Vivek Raj Wangkhem	MSCP	6,510	29.44%	Mahammuddin Shah	INC	6,138	27.76%	372
5	Thongju	92.06%	Bijoy Koijam	MSCP	7,510	34.88%	Dr. Sapam Dhananjoy	NCP	5,729	26.60%	1,781
6	Keirao	95.67%	Md. Alauddin Khan	INC	5,293	27.85%	Karam Thamarjit Singh	Manipur National Conference	3,771	19.84%	1,522
7	Andro	93.68%	Salam Chandra Singh	FPM	5,402	25.15%	Sahid Ahamad	SAP	5,188	24.15%	214
8	Lamlai	90.13%	Pheiroijam Parijat Singh	CPI	5,652	30.13%	Khongbantabam Ibomcha Singh	NCP	5,457	29.09%	195
9	Thangmeiband	76.05%	Meinam Bhorot Singh	BJP	6,686	38.67%	Radhabinod Koijam	SAP	5,066	29.30%	1,620
10	Uripok	82.13%	Laishram Nandakumar Singh	INC	7,037	46.33%	P. Achou Singh	FPM	4,740	31.20%	2,297
11	Sagolband	78.90%	Soram Natum Singh	Manipur National Conference	5,394	34.31%	Dr. Khwairakpam Loken Singh	INC	4,572	29.08%	822
12	Keishamthong	87.23%	Laisom Ibomcha Singh	FPM	6,479	30.86%	Langpoklakpam Jayantakumar Singh	INC	6,392	30.44%	87
13	Singjamei	88.54%	Irengbam Hemochandra Singh	FPM	7,150	45.10%	Haobam Bhuban Singh	NCP	6,172	38.93%	978
14	Yaiskul	82.57%	Rajkumar Dorendra Singh	BJP	8,107	45.01%	Elangbam Kunjeswar Singh	INC	6,981	38.76%	1,126
15	Wangkhei	83.54%	Erabot Yumkham	MSCP	7,999	35.47%	Anoubam Rajen	FPM	7,500	33.26%	499
16	Sekmai	89.17%	Ningthoujam Biren	FPM	6,023	33.71%	Khwairakpam Chandra	NCP	4,739	26.52%	1,284
17	Lamsang	91.09%	Wangkheimayum Brajabidhu Singh	INC	11,859	54.39%	Sorokhaibam Rajen Singh	FPM	9,579	43.93%	2,280
18	Konthoujam	92.19%	Dr. Thokchom Meinya	DRPP	5,152	25.03%	Henam Lokhon Singh	MSCP	4,223	20.52%	929
19	Patsoi	87.95%	Moirangthem Nabadwip	CPI	8,622	39.27%	Dr. Leishangthem Chandramani Singh	FPM	7,700	35.07%	922
20	Langthabal	93.04%	O. Joy Singh	MPP	4,353	24.30%	Karam Babudhon Singh	Manipur National Conference	3,614	20.18%	739
21	Naoriya Pakhanglakpa	93.30%	Wahengbam Leima Devi	INC	5,712	24.37%	R. K. Anand	DRPP	4,990	21.29%	722
22	Wangoi	95.66%	Yumnam Mani Singh	MSCP	7,526	40.57%	Wahengbam Nipamacha Singh	Manipur National Conference	6,911	37.25%	615
23	Mayang Imphal	93.19%	Meinam Nilchandra Singh	FPM	5,688	30.46%	Abdul Salam	Manipur National Conference	5,612	30.05%	76
24	Nambol	93.02%	Nameirakpam Loken Singh	INC	10,599	45.72%	Thounaojam Bira Singh	MSCP	9,661	41.67%	938
25	Oinam	89.85%	Laishram Radhakishore Singh	NCP	7,182	36.66%	Dr. Yumnam Jiten Singh	MSCP	6,595	33.67%	587
26	Bishnupur	91.90%	Govindas Konthoujam	MSCP	10,833	49.56%	Ningthoujam Sanajaoba Singh	DRPP	9,548	43.68%	1,285
27	Moirang	93.12%	Salam Gopal Singh	FPM	7,975	30.37%	Mohammad Abdul Matalib	MSCP	6,604	25.15%	1,371
28	Thanga	92.35%	Salam Ibohal Singh	FPM	3,781	22.89%	Haobijam Manisana Singh	MSCP	3,765	22.79%	16
29	Kumbi	88.68%	Ningthoujam Mangi Singh	CPI	5,148	26.68%	Aheibam Angousana	BJP	4,518	23.41%	630
30	Lilong	92.45%	Dr. Md. Maniruddin Shaikh	INC	7,561	38.65%	Md. Helaluddin Khan	Manipur National Conference	6,066	31.00%	1,495
31	Thoubal	92.28%	Leitanthem Tomba Singh	FPM	5,502	26.24%	Tourangbam Mukesh Singh	INC	4,777	22.78%	725
32	Wangkhem	94.98%	Dr. Nimai Chand Luwang	MPP	6,139	29.16%	Thokchom Chandra Singh	MSCP	6,065	28.80%	74
33	Heirok	92.08%	Nongmeikapam Sovakiran Singh	FPM	9,376	46.09%	Moirangthem Okendro	INC	8,772	43.12%	604
34	Wangjing Tentha	91.53%	Moirangthem Nara Singh	CPI	9,249	43.16%	Moirangthem Hemanta Singh	MSCP	7,720	36.03%	1,529
35	Khangabok	97.08%	Okram Ibobi Singh	INC	12,897	53.21%	Laishram Jatra	FPM	10,567	43.60%	2,330
36	Wabgai	93.67%	Md. Abdul Salam	INC	7,512	37.88%	Mayengbam Manihar Singh	MSCP	7,496	37.80%	16
37	Kakching	86.50%	Thokchom Tomba Singh	CPI	9,377	51.22%	Nongmaithem Nimai Singh	INC	7,483	40.88%	1,894
38	Hiyanglam	92.29%	Elangbam Biramani Singh	NCP	6,095	31.26%	Maibam Kunjo	FPM	4,841	24.83%	1,254
39	Sugnu	89.40%	Kangujam Ranjit Singh	INC	7,318	38.17%	Khwairakpam Iboyaima	DRPP	5,675	29.60%	1,643
40	Jiribam	72.08%	Th. Debendra	INC	5,527	31.37%	Ashangbam Biren	Manipur National Conference	4,588	26.04%	939
41	Chandel	95.83%	B. D. Behring	BJP	23,219	64.58%	T. Chungsei Haokip	MSCP	8,750	24.34%	14,469
42	Tengnoupal	98.77%	D.K. Korungthang	SAP	17,140	51.88%	Onjamang Haokip	NCP	15,529	47.00%	1,611
43	Phungyar	87.65%	K. Wungnaoshang	MSCP	4,412	22.53%	Rishang Keishing	INC	3,403	17.38%	1,009
44	Ukhrul	80.48%	Danny Shaiza	BJP	12,285	50.88%	A. S. Arthur	INC	8,023	33.23%	4,262
45	Chingai	87.64%	A. Aza	INC	7,761	27.64%	Dr. Khashim Ruivah	FPM	7,294	25.98%	467
46	Saikul	91.17%	Chungkhokai Doungel	NCP	9,989	35.06%	Doukhomang Khongsai	SAP	7,827	27.47%	2,162
47	Karong	98.00%	P. S. Henry Paotei	FPM	10,304	23.73%	D. D. Thaisii	INC	9,000	20.73%	1,304
48	Mao	98.10%	R. K. Thekho	INC	13,387	30.52%	Soso Lorho	FPM	12,936	29.50%	451
49	Tadubi	97.44%	Francis Ngajokpa	INC	8,766	24.60%	K. Raina	BJP	8,416	23.62%	350
50	Kangpokpi	88.88%	Thangminlen	FPM	9,265	39.53%	Hari Prasad Nepal	BJP	5,869	25.04%	3,396
51	Saitu	96.08%	Ngamthang Haokip	INC	13,675	42.93%	Haokholet Kipgen	SAP	8,359	26.24%	5,316
52	Tamei	95.77%	Z. Mangaibou	INC	9,893	41.38%	Athuan Abonmei	BJP	8,742	36.57%	1,151
53	Tamenglong	87.37%	Samuel Jendai	FPM	9,696	53.55%	Khangthuanang Panmei	INC	7,302	40.33%	2,394
54	Nungba	89.42%	Gaikhangam Gangmei	INC	6,977	45.24%	Prof. Gangmumei Kamei	FPM	6,085	39.45%	892
55	Tipaimukh	79.17%	Dr. Chaltonlian Amo	INC	3,602	31.82%	Ngursanglur	NCP	3,566	31.50%	36
56	Thanlon	80.36%	Songchinkhup	INC	4,825	35.87%	John K. Ngaihte	SAP	3,817	28.37%	1,008
57	Henglep	92.36%	T. Manga Vaiphei	SAP	7,660	36.97%	T. Thangzalam Haokip	INC	3,662	17.68%	3,998
58	Churachandpur	84.06%	T. Phungzathang	INC	15,271	47.02%	V. Hangkhanlian	NCP	15,043	46.32%	228
59	Saikot	92.59%	T. N. Haokip	INC	16,699	51.29%	M. Chungkhosei Haokip	NCP	11,966	36.75%	4,733
60	Singhat	87.93%	Thangso Baite	MSCP	6,815	35.74%	Hangkhanpao	INC	5,314	27.87%	1,501

== See also ==
- List of constituencies of the Manipur Legislative Assembly
- 2002 elections in India
