= Maibam Kunjo =

Indian politician (1942–2014)

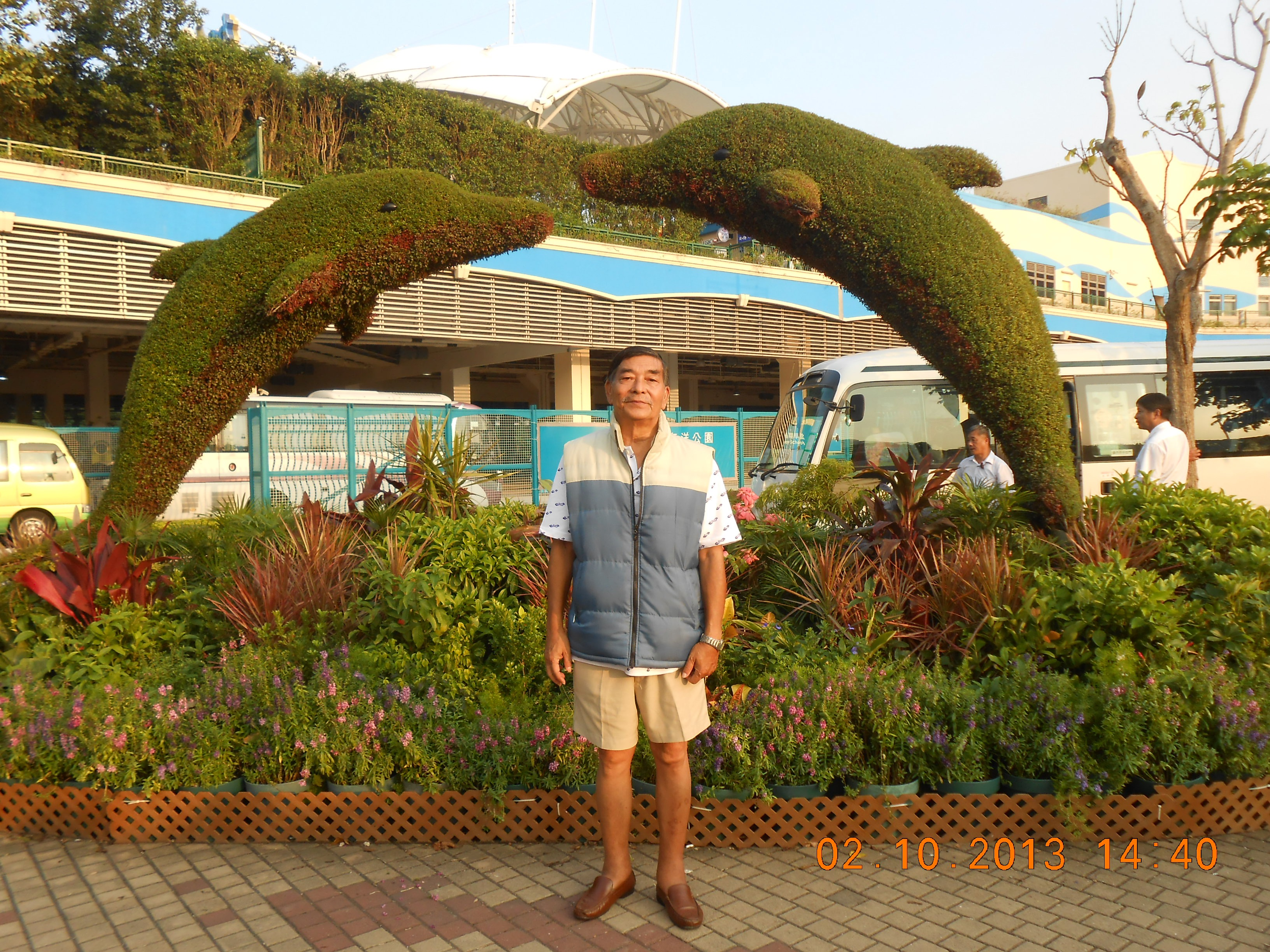
- Constituency: Hiyanglam Assembly Constituency, Manipur

Personal details
- Born: 1940/41
- Died: 11 August 2014
- Party: All India Trinamool Congress
- Spouse: (L) Ashem Bimola Devi
- Children: Maibam Jibonlata Devi, Maibam Dhanabir, Maibam Barnabir, Maibam Karnabir, Maibam Ranabir, Maibam Chandrabir, Maibam Sujalata

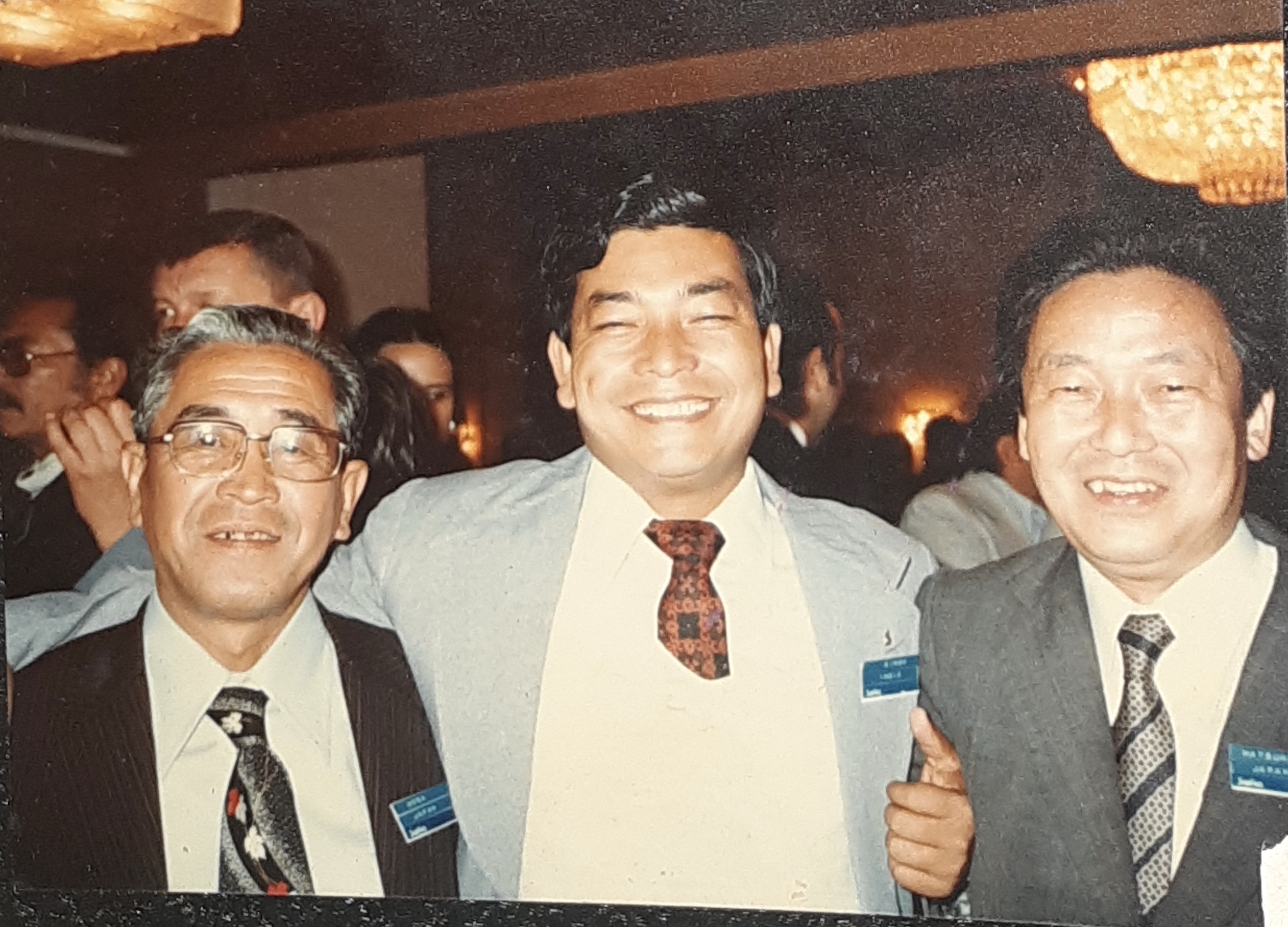
Kunjo in the middle, with the Japanese Associates in 1982 WHO Annual Conference, Moscow. He was one of 3 delegates of Manipur State to attend the Annual Conference of the World Health Organization in 1982, Moscow, Russia. The 2 among them were the well-known M .K. Binodini and Moirangthem Ibohal.

Maibam Kunjo Singh (16 August 1942 – 11 August 2014) was an Indian politician and MLA of Manipur Legislative Assembly. He was elected to the Manipur Legislative Assembly from Hiyanglam in Thoubal district, Manipur for four terms.

== Politics & history ==
In 1972, he contested his first election and was elected to Manipur Legislative Assembly for the first time in 1974 on a Manipur Peoples Party(MPP) ticket. Kunjo was again re-elected as Member of the Legislative Assembly in 1995 on a Janata Dal(JD) ticket and became the Minister of Rural Development and Panchayati raj, Veterinary and Animal Husbandry in Manipur. He was again elected in 2000 elections on a Manipur State Congress Party(MSCP) ticket and became the Minister of Commerce and Industry. Though he won the 2000 election for the 3rd time, he was removed the very next year when President's rule was declared in the state and he lost his seat in the 2002 Assembly election in the state. In 2012 Manipur Legislative Assembly election, he was again re-elected from the same Assembly Constituency on an All India Trinamool Congress ticket and became a Member of the Legislative Assembly, Manipur and also became the Wing Leader of AITC Party. During his tenures he also holds the portfolio as Chairman of Khadi and Village and also the Department of Information and Public Relations and Statistics. In 2014, Kunjo's diabetes led to failure of his kidneys and lungs. At the age of 72 years, he died on 11 August 2014 at his Official Residence in Babupara, Imphal and could not complete his tenure of 5 years.

== Personal life ==
(L)Maibam Kunjo, a son of (L)Maibam Mangoljao Singh of Hiyanglam Awang Leikai, Hiyanglam, Thoubal district, Manipur, was a man of great political vision who work for the upliftment of poor and betterment of the society. During his lifetime he worked as a social worker and politician for the welfare and prosperity of his constituency and the state. His wife Maibam Bimola Devi died in 2005. He left five sons and two daughters.
