= 2027 Manipur Legislative Assembly election =

- February — March 2027

All 60 seats in the Manipur Legislative Assembly 31 seats needed for a majority
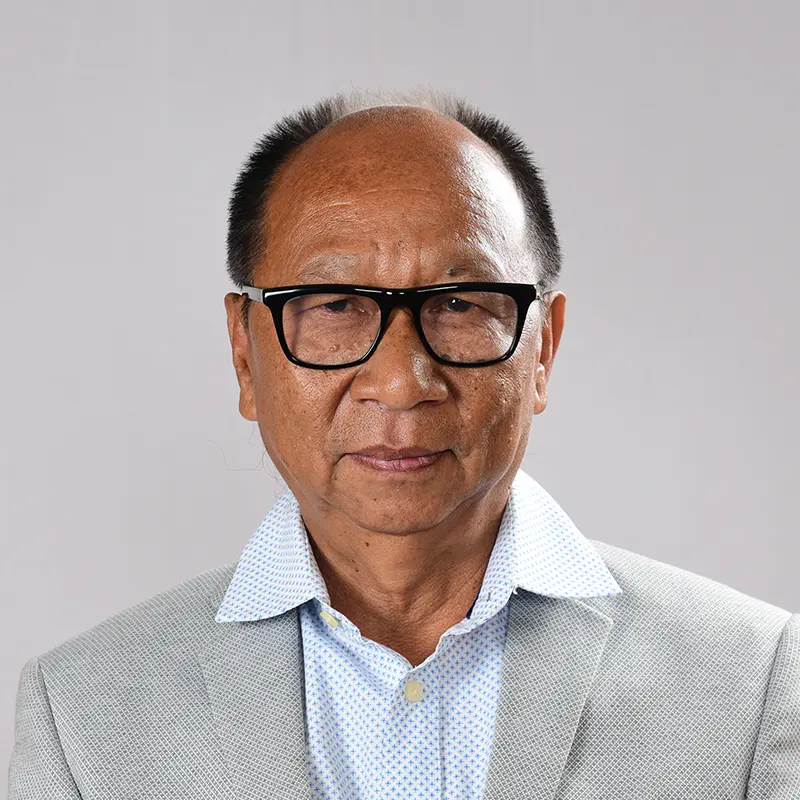

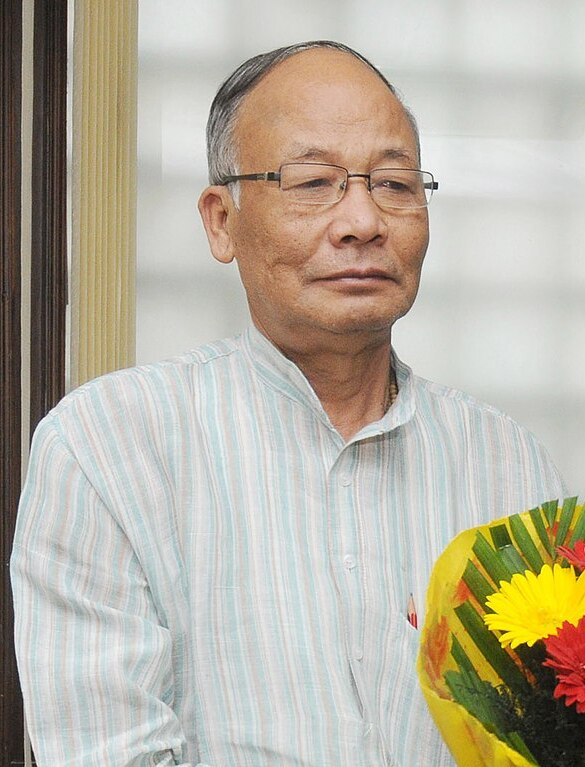
Leader	Y. Khemchand Singh	Okram Ibobi Singh
Party	BJP	INC
Alliance	NDA	INDIA
Leader since	2026	2007
Leader's seat	Singjamei	Thoubal
Last election	32 seats, 37.83%	5 seats, 16.83%
Current seats	36	5
Seats needed	Steady	▲26
- Map of the assembly constituencies in Manipur
Incumbent Chief Minister
Y. Khemchand Singh
BJP

Legislative assembly elections are expected to be held in February to March 2027 to elect all 60 members of the Manipur Legislative Assembly. Y. Khemchand Singh is the incumbent Chief Minister of Manipur.

== Schedule ==
Poll Event	Schedule
Notification Date	TBD
Last Date for filing nomination	TBD
Scrutiny of nomination	TBD
Last Date for Withdrawal of nomination	TBD
Date of Poll	TBD
Date of Counting of Votes	TBD

== Parties and Alliances ==
Party	Flag	Symbol	Leader	Seats contested
Bharatiya Janata Party			Yumnam Khemchand Singh	TBD
Indian National Congress			Okram Ibobi Singh	TBD
National People's Party			Yumnam Joykumar Singh	TBD
Janata Dal (United)			Muhammad Abdul Nasir	TBD
Naga People's Front			Losii Dikho	TBD
Republican Party of India (Athawale)			Ramdas Athawale	TBD
Kuki People's Alliance			WL Hangshing	TBD
Communist Party of India			L. Sotin Kumar	TBD
Lok Janshakti Party (Ram Vilas)				TBD

== Candidates ==
District	Constituency					
District	Constituency		BJP		INC	
Imphal East	1	Khundrakpam	BJP		INC	
Imphal East	2	Heingang	BJP	N. Biren Singh	INC	
Imphal East	3	Khurai	BJP		INC	
Imphal East	4	Kshetrigao	BJP		INC	
Imphal East	5	Thongju	BJP		INC	
Imphal East	6	Keirao	BJP	Lourembam Rameshwor Meetei	INC	
Imphal East	7	Andro	BJP		INC	
Imphal East	8	Lamlai	BJP		INC	
Imphal West	9	Thangmeiband	BJP		INC	
Imphal West	10	Uripok	BJP		INC	
Imphal West	11	Sagolband	BJP		INC	
Imphal West	12	Keishamthong	BJP		INC	
Imphal West	13	Singjamei	BJP	Yumnam Khemchand Singh	INC	
Imphal East	14	Yaiskul	BJP		INC	
Imphal East	15	Wangkhei	BJP		INC	
Imphal West	16	Sekmai (SC)	BJP		INC	
Imphal West	17	Lamsang	BJP		INC	
Imphal West	18	Konthoujam	BJP		INC	
Imphal West	19	Patsoi	BJP		INC	
Imphal West	20	Langthabal	BJP		INC	
Imphal West	21	Naoriya Pakhanglakpa	BJP		INC	
Imphal West	22	Wangoi	BJP		INC	
Imphal West	23	Mayang Imphal	BJP		INC	
Bishnupur	24	Nambol	BJP	Thounaojam Basanta Kumar Singh	INC	
Bishnupur	25	Oinam	BJP		INC	
Bishnupur	26	Bishnupur	BJP	Govindas Konthoujam	INC	
Bishnupur	27	Moirang	BJP		INC	
Bishnupur	28	Thanga	BJP		INC	
Bishnupur	29	Kumbi	BJP		INC	
Thoubal	30	Lilong	BJP		INC	
Thoubal	31	Thoubal	BJP		INC	Okram Ibobi Singh
Thoubal	32	Wangkhem	BJP		INC	Keisham Meghachandra Singh
Thoubal	33	Heirok	BJP		INC	
Thoubal	34	Wangjing Tentha	BJP		INC	
Thoubal	35	Khangabok	BJP		INC	
Thoubal	36	Wabgai	BJP		INC	
Thoubal	37	Kakching	BJP		INC	
Thoubal	38	Hiyanglam	BJP		INC	
Thoubal	39	Sugnu	BJP		INC	
Jiribam	40	Jiribam	BJP		INC	
Jiribam	41	Chandel (ST)	BJP		INC	
Jiribam	42	Tengnoupal (ST)	BJP		INC	
Ukhrul	43	Phungyar (ST)	BJP		INC	
Ukhrul	44	Ukhrul (ST)	BJP		INC	
Ukhrul	45	Chingai (ST)	BJP		INC	
Senapati	46	Karong (ST)	BJP		INC	
Senapati	47	Mao (ST)	BJP		INC	
Senapati	48	Tadubi (ST)	BJP		INC	
Kangpokpi	49	Saikul (ST)	BJP		INC	
Kangpokpi	50	Kangpokpi	BJP		INC	
Kangpokpi	51	Saitu (ST)	BJP		INC	
Tamenglong	52	Tamei (ST)	BJP		INC	
Tamenglong	53	Tamenglong (ST)	BJP		INC	
Tamenglong	54	Nungba (ST)	BJP		INC	
Pherzawl	55	Tipaimukh (ST)	BJP		INC	
Pherzawl	56	Thanlon (ST)	BJP		INC	
Churachandpur	57	Henglep (ST)	BJP		INC	
Churachandpur	58	Churachandpur (ST)	BJP		INC	
Churachandpur	59	Saikot (ST)	BJP		INC	
Churachandpur	60	Singhat (ST)	BJP		INC	

== Surveys and polls ==
=== Opinion polls ===
Vote Share Projections
Polling agency	Date published	Sample size	Margin of Error				Lead
Polling agency	Date published	Sample size	Margin of Error	BJP	INC	Others	Lead

Seat Projections
Polling agency	Date published	Sample size	Margin of Error				Lead
Polling agency	Date published	Sample size	Margin of Error	BJP	INC	Others	Lead

=== Exit polls ===
Polling agency	Date published	Sample size	Margin of Error				Lead
Polling agency	Date published	Sample size	Margin of Error	BJP	INC	Others	Lead

== Results ==
=== Results by alliance or party ===
Alliance/ Party	Popular vote			Seats		
Alliance/ Party	Votes	%	±pp	Contested	Won	+/−
Bharatiya Janata Party						
Indian National Congress						
National People's Party						
Naga People's Front						
Janata Dal (United)						
Communist Party of India						
Kuki People's Alliance						
Republican Party of India (Athawale)						
Independents						
NOTA						
Total		100%	—		60	—

=== Results by district ===
District	Seats			
District	Seats	BJP	INC	OTH
Imphal East	10			
Imphal West	13			
Bishnupur	6			
Thoubal	10			
Jiribam	3			
Ukhrul	3			
Senapati	3			
Kangpokpi	3			
Tamenglong	3			
Pherzawl	2			
Churachandpur	4			
Total	60			

=== Results by constituency ===
District	Constituency		Winner				Runner Up				Margin
District	No.	Name	Candidate	Party	Votes	%	Candidate	Party	Votes	%	Margin
Imphal East	1	Khundrakpam									
Imphal East	2	Heingang									
Imphal East	3	Khurai									
Imphal East	4	Kshetrigao									
Imphal East	5	Thongju									
Imphal East	6	Keirao									
Imphal East	7	Andro									
Imphal East	8	Lamlai									
Imphal West	9	Thangmeiband									
Imphal West	10	Uripok									
Imphal West	11	Sagolband									
Imphal West	12	Keishamthong									
Imphal West	13	Singjamei									
Imphal East	14	Yaiskul									
Imphal East	15	Wangkhei									
Imphal West	16	Sekmai (SC)									
Imphal West	17	Lamsang									
Imphal West	18	Konthoujam									
Imphal West	19	Patsoi									
Imphal West	20	Langthabal									
Imphal West	21	Naoriya Pakhanglakpa									
Imphal West	22	Wangoi									
Imphal West	23	Mayang Imphal									
Bishnupur	24	Nambol									
Bishnupur	25	Oinam									
Bishnupur	26	Bishnupur									
Bishnupur	27	Moirang									
Bishnupur	28	Thanga									
Bishnupur	29	Kumbi									
Thoubal	30	Lilong									
Thoubal	31	Thoubal									
Thoubal	32	Wangkhem									
Thoubal	33	Heirok									
Thoubal	34	Wangjing Tentha									
Thoubal	35	Khangabok									
Thoubal	36	Wabgai									
Thoubal	37	Kakching									
Thoubal	38	Hiyanglam									
Thoubal	39	Sugnu									
Jiribam	40	Jiribam									
Jiribam	41	Chandel (ST)									
Jiribam	42	Tengnoupal (ST)									
Ukhrul	43	Phungyar (ST)									
Ukhrul	44	Ukhrul (ST)									
Ukhrul	45	Chingai (ST)									
Senapati	46	Karong (ST)									
Senapati	47	Mao (ST)									
Senapati	48	Tadubi (ST)									
Kangpokpi	49	Saikul (ST)									
Kangpokpi	50	Kangpokpi									
Kangpokpi	51	Saitu (ST)									
Tamenglong	52	Tamei (ST)									
Tamenglong	53	Tamenglong (ST)									
Tamenglong	54	Nungba (ST)									
Pherzawl	55	Tipaimukh (ST)									
Pherzawl	56	Thanlon (ST)									
Churachandpur	57	Henglep (ST)									
Churachandpur	58	Churachandpur (ST)									
Churachandpur	59	Saikot (ST)									
Churachandpur	60	Singhat (ST)									

== See also ==
- 2027 elections in India
- Elections in Manipur
- Government of Manipur
- Manipur Legislative Assembly
- List of chief ministers of Manipur
- List of deputy chief ministers of Manipur
- Politics of Manipur
