= Kishore Thapa =

Indian politician

Member of the Manipur Legislative Assembly
- In office 1974–1990
- Succeeded by: L. S. John
- Constituency: Kangpokpi

Personal details
- Party: Samata Party
- Other political affiliations: Indian National Congress

Kishore Thapa is an Indian politician. He was elected to the Manipur Legislative Assembly from Kangpokpi constituency in 1974, 1980 and 1984 Manipur Legislative Assembly election as a member of the Indian National Congress. Later, he joined Samata Party (now led by Uday Mandal its President).
