= Politics of Manipur =

The key political players in Manipur state in north-east India is the ruling Bharatiya Janata Party and opposition Congress

== National Politics of Manipur ==
There are only 2 Lok Sabha (lower house of the Indian Parliament) constituencies in Manipur.

== The State Politics of Manipur ==
The Manipur Legislative Assembly has 60 seats directly elected from single-seat constituencies.

== Also see this ==
- Manipur Legislative Assembly
