= 2012 Manipur Legislative Assembly election =

- 28 January 2012

All 60 assembly constituencies 31 seats needed for a majority
- Turnout: 79.19%
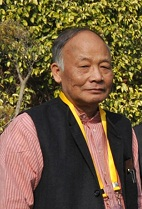

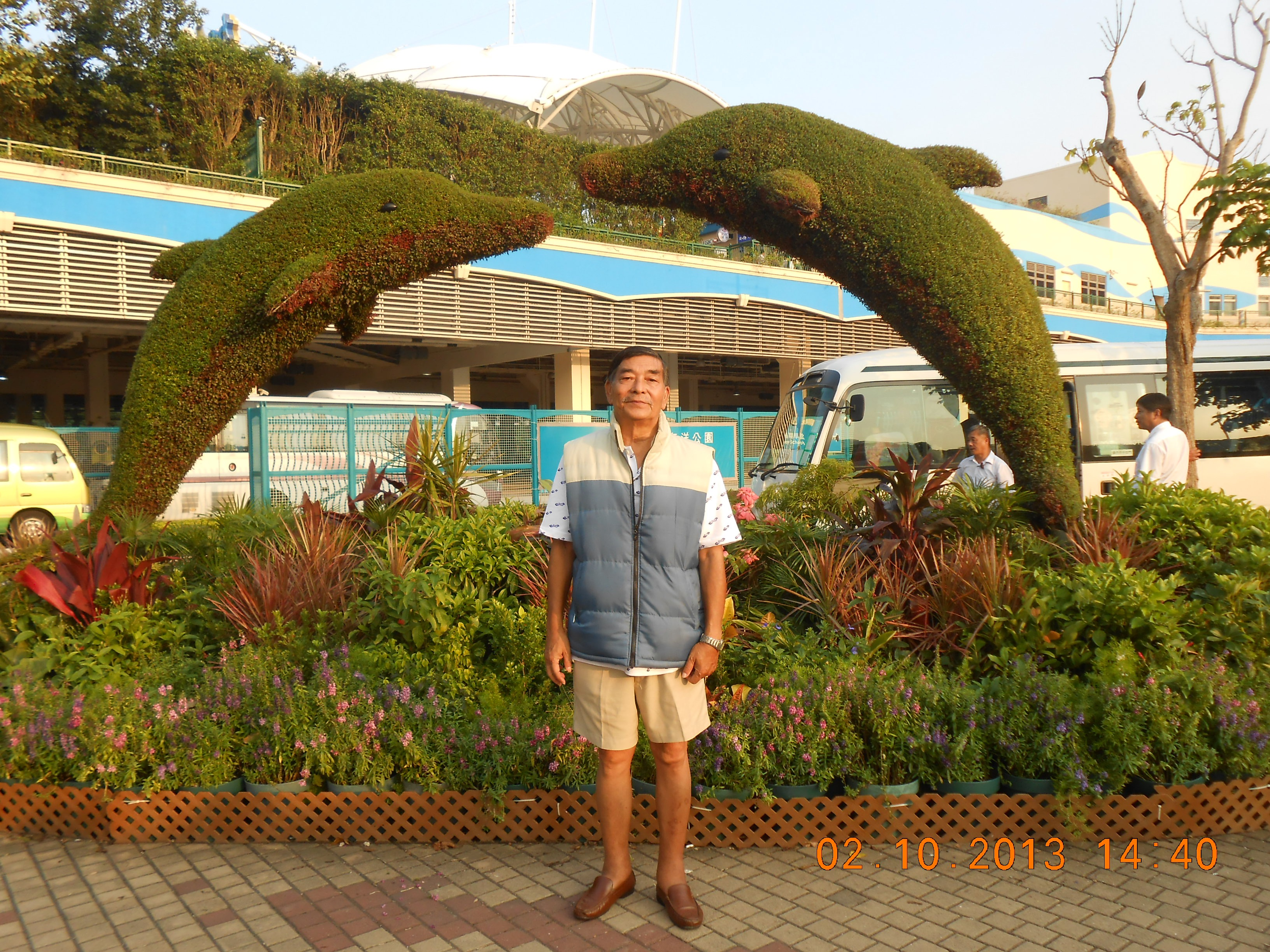
	Majority party	Minority party
Leader	Okram Ibobi Singh	Maibam Kunjo
Party	INC	AITC
Alliance	UPA	-
Leader's seat	Thoubal	Hiyanglam
Last election	30	did not contest
Seats before	30	New
Seats after	42	7
Seat change	▲12	New
Popular vote	592,566	237,517
Percentage	42.4%	17%
Swing	▲8.1%	New

- Structure of the Manipur Legislative Assembly after the election
Chief Minister before election
Okram Ibobi Singh
INC
Elected Chief Minister
Okram Ibobi Singh
INC

The 2012 Manipur Legislative Assembly election was held in Indian state of Manipur in Feb-March 2012, to elect 60 members to the Manipur Legislative Assembly.

== Parties contested ==
Party	Flag	Symbol	Leader	Seats contested
Indian National Congress			Okram Ibobi Singh	60
All India Trinamool Congress			Maibam Kunjo	47
Manipur State Congress Party			Y. Mani Singh	31
Communist Party of India			Ardhendu Bhushan Bardhan	24
Nationalist Congress Party			P. A. Sangma	22
Bharatiya Janata Party			Nitin Gadkari	19
Manipur People's Party			O. Joy Singh	14
Naga People's Front			Neiphiu Rio	12

== Results ==
The Voter turnout was 79.19%. Congress won majority of the seats, the first time in the history of the state that a single party held a majority, which was helped by the divide in the opposition forces. Incumbent Chief Minister Okram Ibobi Singh was re-elected for the post.

The opposition was divided between the People's Democratic Front, five-party grand alliance consisting of the Manipur Peoples Party, Nationalist Congress Party, Janata Dal (United), Communist Party of India (Marxist), and the Rashtriya Janata Dal which did not put up any candidate. The Trinamool Congress was the over major political party contesting.

In 2014, the Manipur State Congress Party (MSCP) merged with the Indian National Congress which raised the number of INC MLAs to 47.

← Summary of the 2012 Manipur Legislative Assembly election results →
Parties and coalitions	Popular vote			Seats	
Parties and coalitions	Votes	%	±pp	Won	+/−
Indian National Congress (INC)	592,566	42.4		42	▲12
All India Trinamool Congress (AITC)	237,517	17.0		7	▲7
Manipur State Congress Party (MSCP)	117,170	8.4		5	▲5
Naga People's Front (NPF)	104,793	7.2		4	▲4
Nationalist Congress Party (NCP)	100,986	7.2		1	▼4
Communist Party of India (CPI)	80,798	5.8		0	▼4
Manipur People's Party (MPP)	73,276	5.2		0	▼8
Lok Janshakti Party (LJP)	7,727	0.6		1	▲1
Rashtriya Janata Dal (RJD)	—N/a			0	▼3
Independent	46,023	3.3		0	▼10
Total		100.00		60	±0

=== Results by constituency ===
The list of winners and runners-up in each constituency are given below:

#	Constituency	Winner	Party	Runner-up Candidate	Party
1	Khundrakpam	Thokchom Lokeshwar Singh	INC	I. Mangiton	BJP
2	Heingang	N. Biren	INC	Naoroibam Ratan (Kapu) Meetei	NCP
3	Khurai	Dr. Ng. Bijoy Singh	INC	Leishangthem Shusindro Meitei	AITC
4	Kshetrigao	Md. Amin Shah	INC	Thangjam Nandakishor Singh	NCP
5	Thongju	Thongam Biswajit Singh	AITC	Bijoy Koijam	INC
6	Keirao	Karam Thamarjit Singh	MSCP	Md. Alauddin Khan	INC
7	Andro	Thounaojam Shyamkumar	AITC	Alhaj Md. Ahamed Ali	INC
8	Lamlai	Kshetrimayum Biren Singh	INC	Pheiroijam Parijat Singh	CPI
9	Thangmeiband	Khumukcham Joykishan	AITC	Jyotin Waikhom	INC
10	Uripok	L. Nandakumar Singh	INC	N. Dwijamani Singh	Independent
11	Sagolband	Rajkumar Imo Singh	MSCP	Dr. Khwairakpam Loken Singh	INC
12	Keishamthong	L. Ibomcha Singh	NCP	Langpoklakpam Jayantakumar Singh	INC
13	Singjamei	Irengbam Hemochandra Singh	INC	Yumnam Khemchand Singh	AITC
14	Yaiskul	Elangbam Chand Singh	INC	Hanjabam Jayadeva Sharma	Independent
15	Wangkhei	Yumkham Erabot Singh	INC	Henry Okram	MSCP
16	Sekmai (SC)	Khwairakpam Devendro Singh	INC	Heikham Dingo Singh	AITC
17	Lamsang	Wangkheimayum Brajabidhu Singh	INC	Sorokhaibam Rajen Singh	NCP
18	Konthoujam	Konthoujam Sharat Singh	AITC	Dr. Sapam Ranjan Singh	INC
19	Patsoi	Akoijam Mirabai Devi	INC	Sapam Kunjakeswor Singh	AITC
20	Langthabal	Karam Shyam	LJP	Okram Joy Singh	MPP
21	Naoriya pakhanglakpa	R.K Anand	INC	Keisham Rojenkumar Singh	AITC
22	Wangoi	Oinam Lukhoi Singh	AITC	Salam Joy Singh	NCP
23	Mayang imphal	Khumujam Ratankumar Singh	INC	Kongkham Manglem Singh	AITC
24	Nambol	Shri Nameirakpam Loken Singh	INC	Shri Chaoba	MPP
25	Oinam	Irengbam Ibohalbi Singh	AITC	L. Radhakishore Singh	MSCP
26	Bishnupur	Konthoujam Govindas	INC	Thiyam Yaima	MSCP
27	Moirang	Mairembam Prithviraj Singh	INC	Pukhrem Sharatchandra Singh	NCP
28	Thanga	Tongbram Mangibabu	INC	Tongbram Robindro Singh	AITC
29	Kumbi	Sanasam Bira Singh	INC	Ningthoujam Mangi	CPI
30	Lilong	Md. Abdul Nasir	INC	Md. Azizul Haque Khan	Independent
31	Thoubal	Okram Ibobi Singh	INC	Oinam Indira	BJP
32	Wangkhem	Keisham Meghachandra Singh	INC	Dr. Nimaichand Luwang	MPP
33	Heirok	Moirangthem Okendro	INC	Nongmeikapam Sovakiran Singh	MPP
34	Wangjing tentha	Paonam Brojen	MSCP	Moirangthem Hemanta Singh	INC
35	Khangabok	Okram Landhoni Devi	INC	Laishram Jatra Singh	MPP
36	Wabgai	Muhammad Fajur Rahim	INC	Dr. Usham Deben Singh	AITC
37	Kakching	Yengkhom Surchandra Singh	INC	Naorem Achouba	CPI
38	Hiyanglam	Maibam Kunjo	AITC	Elangbam Dwijamani Singh	INC
39	Sugnu	Kangujam Ranjit Singh	INC	Yumnam Jiban (Shangba)	CPI
40	Jiribam	Thoudam Debendra Singh	INC	A. Biren	AITC
41	Chandel (ST)	St. Nunghlung Victor	NPF	Thangkholun Haokip	INC
42	Tengnoupal (ST)	D. Korungthang	INC	Kh. David Charanga	NPF
43	Phungyar (ST)	Victor Keishing	INC	Honreikhui Kashung	NPF
44	Ukhrul (ST)	Samuel Risom	NPF	Alfred Kan-Ngam Arthur	INC
45	Chingai (ST)	MK Preshow Shimray	INC	Khashim Vashum	Independent
46	Saikul (ST)	Yamthong Haokip	INC	Chungkhokai Doungel	AITC
47	Karong (ST)	Dr. V. Alexander Pao	NPF	D. D. Thaisii	INC
48	Mao (ST)	Dikho	NPF	P. T. Arhai	INC
49	Tadubi (ST)	Francis Ngajokpa	INC	K. Raina	NPF
50	Kangpokpi	Mrs. Nemcha Kipgen	MSCP	Khadga Bahadur	AITC
51	Saitu (ST)	Ngamthang Haokip	INC	Haokholet Kipgen	MPP
52	Tamei (ST)	Z.Kikhonbou Newmai	INC	Awangbow Newmai	MSCP
53	Tamenglong (ST)	Janghemlung Panmei	MSCP	Khangthuanang Panmei	INC
54	Nungba (ST)	Gaikhangam	INC	Adim Pamei	MSCP
55	Tipaimukh (ST)	Dr.Chaltonlien Amo	INC	Dr . Lalumkhum Fimate	AITC
56	Thanlon (ST)	Vungzagin Valte	INC	V.Hangkhanlian	MPP
57	Henglep (ST)	T.Manga Vaiphei	INC	T.Thangzalam Haokip	AITC
58	Churachandpur (ST)	Phungzathang Tonsing	INC	P.Songlianlal	AITC
59	Saikot (ST)	T.N.Haokip	INC	Lunkholal	AITC
60	Singhat (ST)	Ginsuanhau	INC	T.Hangkhanpau	AITC

== See also ==
- List of constituencies of the Manipur Legislative Assembly
- 2012 elections in India
