= Manipur National Conference =

The Manipur National Conference was a political party in the Indian state of Manipur. MNC was formed in 2002, when a split occurred in the Manipur State Congress Party. Two competing factions struggled to be recognized as the authentic MSCP. In the end the Election Commission recognized the Th. Chaoba-led group as the real MSCP. W Nipamacha Singh (former Chief Minister of Manipur) then re-christened his group as 'Manipur National Conference'.

== Elections ==
In the 2002 state assembly elections MNC supported the Secular Progressive Front. MNC won one seat in the elections.

== Merger with RJD ==
In 2005, MNC merged with RJD.
