= Federal Party of Manipur =

- President: Gangmumei Kamei
- Founded: 21 October 1993
- Dissolved: 2007
- Merged into: Manipur People's Party
- ECI Status: State Party

Election symbol
- (The rising sun)

The Federal Party of Manipur (FPM) was a political party in the Indian state of Manipur founded by Gangmumei Kamei in 1993.

Prior to the 2007 Legislative Assembly election, the FPM, along with the Democratic Revolutionary People's Party, merged into the Manipur People's Party.

== Election results ==
Legislative Assembly election results
	Seats			Votes		
	Contested	Won	+/-	Total	%	+/-
1995	22	2		56,300	4.91	
2000	39	6	4 ▲	118,916	9.44	4.53 ▲
2002	48	13	7 ▲	239,444	18.14	8.7 ▲
