= Manipur State Congress Party =

- Founder: Wahengbam Nipamacha Singh
- Founded: 1997
- Dissolved: 4 April 2014
- Merged into: Indian National Congress
- Headquarters: People’s Road, Imphal- 795001, Manipur
- ECI Status: De-recognised state party

Election symbol

Manipur State Congress Party (MSCP) is a former political party in the Indian state of Manipur. The party was founded in 1997 by Wahengbam Nipamacha as a split from the Indian National Congress (INC). In 2014 the MCSP remerged with the INC.

== History ==
The party was formed after a group of ministers and legislators, led by former Speaker Nipamacha, broke away from the ruling Indian National Congress and floated the MSCP which subsequently formed the next government. "Cultivator Cutting Crop" is the election symbol of the party. Nipamacha then became the chief minister of a coalition government led by the party. In the 1999 Lok Sabha elections, then-MSCP candidate Th. Chaoba Singh got elected and became Union Minister of State for Food Processing during Atal Behari Vajpayee's tenure.

In February 2001, 22 members of the MSCP formed an alliance with Samta Party to form the government in Manipur led by Radhabinod Koijam.

== Merged with INC ==
The Manipur State Congress Party (MSCP) merged back with the Indian National Congress with its five party MLAs on 4 April 2014. The last party president was Y. Mani Singh. It was de-recognised by the Election Commission of India in June 2015.

== Elections ==
In 2002 Legislative Assembly elections in Manipur, Party had contested on 42 out of 60 seats and had won seven seats, and five of them joined the Congress. In 2007 Assembly elections, party had contested on 6 seats but failed to win any seats.

== List of Union Ministers ==
=== Third Vajpayee ministry ===
| # | Name | Constituency | Designation | Department | From | To | Party |
|---|---|---|---|---|---|---|---|
| 1 | Thounaojam Chaoba Singh | Inner Manipur | MoS | Culture, Youth Affairs and Sports | 13 Oct 1999 | 2 Feb 2000 | MSCP |
| 1 | Thounaojam Chaoba Singh | Inner Manipur | MoS | Youth Affairs and Sports (Department) | 2 Feb 2000 | 27 May 2000 | MSCP |
| 1 | Thounaojam Chaoba Singh | Inner Manipur | MoS | Agriculture | 27 May 2000 | 1 Sept 2001 | MSCP |

== See also ==
- Manipur National Conference
