= 2022 Manipur Legislative Assembly election =

Elections for the 13th Legislative assembly of Manipur

- 28 February & 5 March 2022

All 60 seats in the Manipur Legislative Assembly 31 seats needed for a majority
- Turnout: 90.28%(▲3.65 pp)
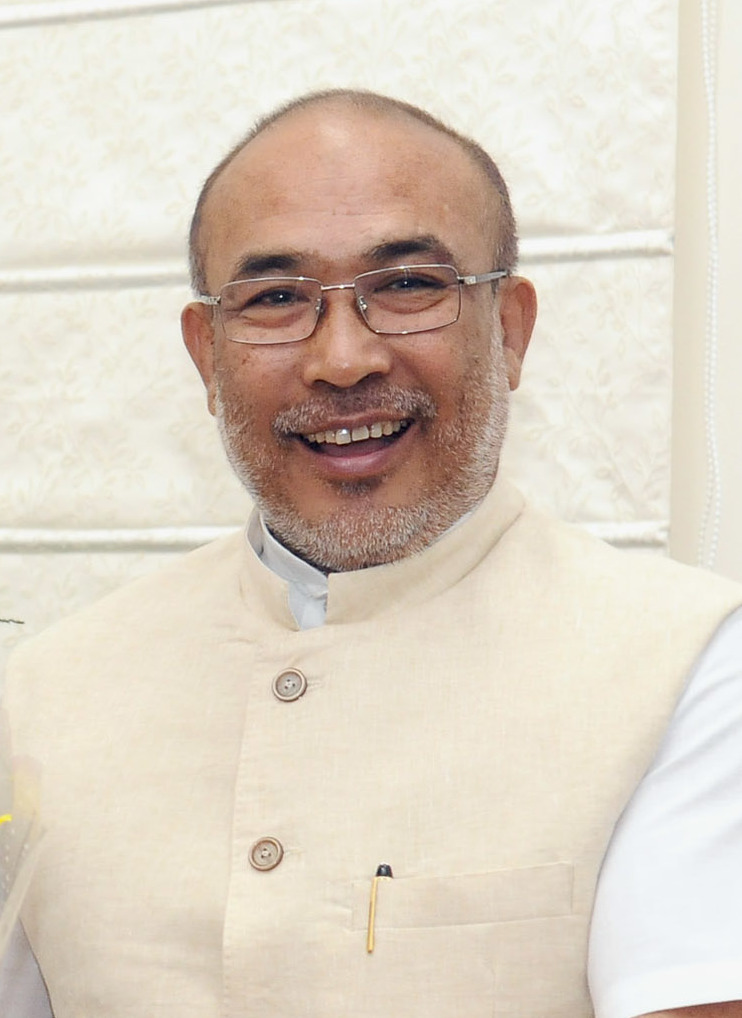

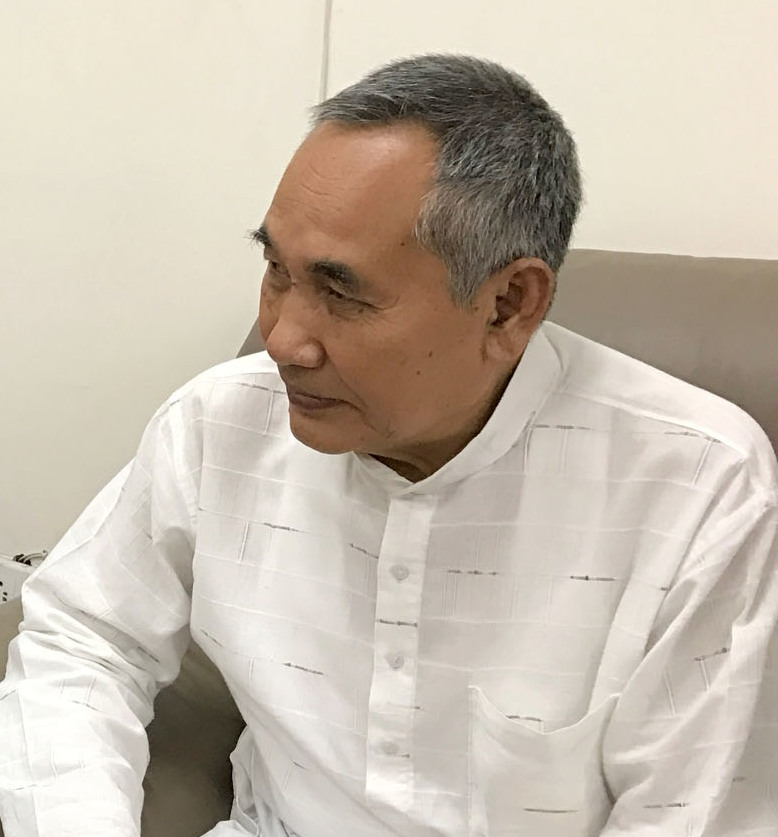

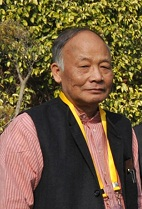
	Majority party	Minority party	Third party
			JD(U)
Leader	N. Biren Singh	Yumnam Joykumar Singh	Hangkhanpau Taithul
Party	BJP	NPP	JD(U)
Alliance	NDA
Leader since	2017	2017	2022
Leader's seat	Heingang	Uripok (Lost)	Singhat (Lost)
Last election	36.28%, 21 seats	5.05%, 4 seats	Did not contest
Seats won	32	7	6
Seat change	▲11	▲3	New
Popular vote	702,632	321,224	200,100
Percentage	37.83%	17.29%	10.77%
Swing	▲2.73 pp	▲12.19 pp	New
	Fourth party	Fifth party	Sixth party
		NPF	KPA
Leader	Okram Ibobi Singh	Losii Dikho	WL Hangshing
Party	INC	NPF	KPA
Alliance	MPSA
Leader since	2002	2017	2022
Leader's seat	Thoubal	Mao
Last election	35.11%, 28 seats	7.17%, 4 seats	New
Seats won	5	5	2
Seat change	▼23	▲1	New
Popular vote	312,659	150,209	10,808
Percentage	16.83%	8.09%	1.01%
Swing	▼18.57 pp	▲0.89 pp	New

- Structure of the Manipur Legislative Assembly after the election
Chief Minister before election
N. Biren Singh
BJP
Elected Chief Minister
N. Biren Singh
BJP

Legislative Assembly elections were held in Manipur from 28 February to 5 March 2022 in two phases, to elect 60 members of the Manipur Legislative Assembly. The results declared on 10 March 2022. The newly constituted assembly was named 12th Manipur Legislative Assembly. The ruling Bharatiya Janata Party (BJP) won 32 out of 60 seats and secured a comfortable majority. N. Biren Singh was re-elected as the chief minister and continued in his office, forming a new ministry. In September 2022, 5 legislators of JD(U) "merged" with BJP taking its total strength to 37 in the Assembly.

After the eruption of the Kuki–Meitei ethnic conflict on 3 May 2023, causing the displacement of over 60,000 people, chief minister Biren Singh was unable to control the violence and resigned on 9 February 2025. President's rule was declared on 13 February, and the legislature was put in suspended animation. Later on 4 February 2026, BJP leader Yumnam Khemchand Singh was sworn in as the new chief minister.

== Background ==
In the 2017 assembly elections the Bharatiya Janata Party (BJP) won 21 seats in a house of 60, and formed a government in alliance with National People's Party (NPP), Naga People's Front (NPF) and Lok Janshakti Party (LJP). N. Biren Singh won the contest for the chief minister, outdoing his rival Thongam Biswajit Singh, the first BJP legislator in the Assembly.

The support of NPP, a partner in the National Democratic Alliance as well as North East Democratic Alliance, was considered key. Its four MLAs were given ministerial posts, with BJP limiting itself to two ministerial posts. By 2020, the relationship between BJP and NPP soured, and the NPP legislators withdrew support. Nevertheless, CM Biren Singh managed to weather the storm by acquiring a few Congress legislators and getting a few others disqualified. BJP's candidate for Rajya Sabha, titular king Leishemba Sanajaoba, won the election, beating his Congress rival T. Mangibabu. Subsequently, NPP returned to the fold of the ruling coalition with reduced influence.

CM Biren Singh also held his ground against his internal rival Biswajit Singh, and acquired three Congress legislators including Govindas Konthoujam, its state unit president. Biren Singh was in a strong position ahead of the polls. He was seen as being friendly towards the hill tribals, and also won the favour of the majority Meitei community by achieving the Inner Line Permit system for Manipur.

The tenure of Manipur Legislative Assembly was scheduled to end on 19 March 2022.

== Schedule ==
The election schedule was announced by the Election Commission of India on 8 January 2022. However, the election dates were postponed from 27 to 28 February for Phase I, and 3 to 5 March for Phase II.

S.No.	Poll event	Phase	
S.No.	Poll event	I	II
1.	Date for Nominations	1 February 2022	4 February 2022
2.	Last date for filing nomination	8 February 2022	11 February 2022
3.	Date for Scrutiny of nomination	9 February 2022	14 February 2022
4.	Last date for withdrawal of nomination	11 February 2022	16 February 2022
5.	Date of poll	28 February 2022	5 March 2022
6.	Date of Counting	10 March 2022	

== Parties and alliances ==
=== Bharatiya Janata Party ===
Bharatiya Janata Party

No.	Party	Flag	Symbol	Leader	Photo	Seats contested	Male Candidates	Female Candidates
1.	Bharatiya Janata Party			Nongthombam Biren Singh		60	57	3

=== United Progressive Alliance ===
United Progressive Alliance

No.	Party	Flag	Symbol	Leader	Photo	Seats contested	Male Candidates	Female Candidates
1.	Indian National Congress			Okram Ibobi Singh		53 (Note: INC and CPI will have a friendly contest on Kakching constituency)	50	3
2.	Communist Party of India			L. Sotin Kumar		2	1	1

=== Naga People's Front ===
Naga People's Front

No.	Party	Flag	Symbol	Leader	Photo	Seats contested	Male Candidates	Female Candidates
1.	Naga People's Front			Losii Dikho		10	10	0

=== National People's Party (India) ===
National People's Party (India)

No.	Party	Flag	Symbol	Leader	Photo	Seats contested	Male Candidates	Female Candidates
1.	National People's Party			Yumnam Joykumar Singh		38	36	2

=== Others ===
No.	Party	Flag	Symbol	Leader	Photo	Seats contested	Male Candidates	Female Candidates
1.	Nationalist Congress Party			Sharad Pawar		8	6	2
2.	Janata Dal (United)			Hangkhanpau Taithul		38	37	1
3.	Shiv Sena			Uddhav Thackeray		9	9	0
4.	Republican Party of India (Athawale)			Ramdas Athawale		9	9	0
5.	Kuki People's Alliance			WL Hangshing		2	1	1

== Candidates ==
Constituency		Voting Date	NDA		MPSA		NPP		JD(U)	
#	Name	Voting Date	Party	Candidate	Party	Candidate	Party	Candidate	Party	Candidate
Imphal East District
1	Khundrakpam	28 February 2022	BJP	Thangjam Mohendro Singh	INC	Thokchom Lokeshwar Singh				
2	Heingang	28 February 2022	BJP	N. Biren Singh	INC	Pangeijam Saratchandra Singh				
3	Khurai	28 February 2022	BJP	Leishangthem Susindro Meitei	CPI	R. K. Amusana	NPP	Laitongjam Jayananda Singh	JD(U)	Toijam Lokendro Singh
4	Kshetrigao	28 February 2022	BJP	Nahakpam Indrajit Singh	INC	Mohammed Amin Shah	NPP	Sheikh Noorul Hassan	JD(U)	Wahengbam Rojit Singh
5	Thongju	28 February 2022	BJP	Thongam Biswajit Singh	INC	Seram Neken Singh			JD(U)	Sanglakpam Preshyojit Sharma
6	Keirao	28 February 2022	BJP	Lourembam Rameshwor Meetei	INC	Thongram Tony Meitei	NPP	Md. Nasiruddin Khan	JD(U)	Yumnam Shanta Meetei
7	Andro	28 February 2022	BJP	Thounaojam Shyamkumar	INC	Keisham Ningthemjao Singh	NPP	Lourembam Sanjoy Singh		
8	Lamlai	28 February 2022	BJP	Kongbantabam Ibomcha Singh	INC	Achoibam Deben Singh			JD(U)	Kshetrimayum Biren Singh
Imphal West District
9	Thangmeiband	28 February 2022	BJP	Jyotin Walkhom	INC	Hijam Nutanchandra Singh			JD(U)	Khumukcham Joykishan
10	Uripok	28 February 2022	BJP	KH. Raghumani Singh	INC	Nungleppam Mahananda Singh	NPP	Yumnam Joykumar Singh	JD(U)	Khombongmayum Suresh Singh
11	Sagolband	28 February 2022	BJP	Rajkumar Imo Singh	INC	Moirangthem Momo Singh			JD(U)	Khwairakpam Loken Singh
12	Keishamthong	28 February 2022	BJP	Elangbam Johnson Singh	INC	Aribam Pramodini Devi	NPP	Langpoklakpam Jayantakumar Singh		
13	Singjamei	28 February 2022	BJP	Yumnam Khemchand Singh	INC	Irengbam Hemochandra Singh	NPP	Oinam Romen Singh	JD(U)	Ngangbam Robert Singh
Imphal East District
14	Yaiskul	28 February 2022	BJP	Thokchom Satyabarta Singh	INC	Ningombam Helendro Singh	NPP	Huidrom Vikramjit Singh	JD(U)	Thounaojam Brinda
15	Wangkhei	28 February 2022	BJP	Okram Henry Singh	INC	Rajkumar Priyobarta Singh	NPP	Yumkham Erabot Singh	JD(U)	Thangjam Arunkumar
Imphal West District
16	Sekmai (SC)	28 February 2022	BJP	Heikham Dingo Singh	INC	Ningthoujam Biren Singh	NPP	Ayangbam Oken Singh	JD(U)	Kwairakpam Devendro Singh
17	Lamsang	28 February 2022	BJP	Sorokhambam Singh	INC	Likmabam Manibabu Singh	NPP	Pukhrambam Sumati Devi	JD(U)	Khundrakpam Kanba Meitei
18	Konthoujam	28 February 2022	BJP	Sapam Ranjan Singh	INC	Laishram Nando Singh	NPP	Konthoujam Sharat Singh	JD(U)	Nongmaithem Herojit Singh
19	Patsoi	28 February 2022	BJP	Sapam Keba Singh	INC	Akoijam Mirabai Devi	NPP	R.K. Rameshwar Singh	JD(U)	Wakambam Ibomcha Singh
20	Langthabal	28 February 2022	BJP	Karam Shyam	INC	O. Joy Singh	NPP	Karam Nabakishor Singh		
21	Naoriya Pakhanglakpa	28 February 2022	BJP	Soraisam Kebi Devi	INC	Soraisham Manaoton Singh	NPP	Soibam Subhaschandra Singh	JD(U)	Konthoujam Manoranjan Singh
22	Wangoi	28 February 2022	BJP	Oinam Lukhoi Singh	INC	Salam Joy Singh	NPP	Khuraijam Loken Singh		
23	Mayang Imphal	28 February 2022	BJP	Kongkham Robindro Singh	INC	Dr Kh Ratankumar Singh	NPP	Urikhimbam Ramesh Singh		
Bishnupur District
24	Nambol	28 February 2022	BJP	Thounaojam Basanta Singh	INC	Nameirakpam Loken Singh				
25	Oinam	28 February 2022	BJP	Laishram Radhkishore Singh	INC	Thokchom Ithoibi Devi	NPP	Irengbam Nalini Devi	JD(U)	Thingbaijam Swarankumar Singh
26	Bishnupur	28 February 2022	BJP	Govindas Konthoujam	INC	Ningthoujam Joykumar Singh			JD(U)	Oinam Nabakishore Singh
27	Moirang	28 February 2022	BJP	M. Prithviraj Singh	INC	Pukhrem Sharatchandra Singh	NPP	Thongam Shanti Singh		
28	Thanga	28 February 2022	BJP	Tongbram Robindro Singh	INC	Birla Haobijam				
29	Kumbi	28 February 2022	BJP	Sanasam Premachandra Singh	INC	Dr. Khangembam Romesh Singh	NPP	Ningthoujam Mangi Singh	JD(U)	Ahanthem Shanjoy Singh
Thoubal and Kakching Districts
30	Lilong	5 March 2022	BJP	Y. Antas Khan	INC	Syed Anwar Hussain			JD(U)	Abdul Nasir
31	Thoubal	5 March 2022	BJP	Leitanthem Basanta Singh	INC	Okram Ibobi Singh			JD(U)	Irom Chaoba Singh
32	Wangkhem	5 March 2022	BJP	Yumnam Nabachandra Singh	INC	Keisham Meghachandra Singh	NPP	Kharibam Jiban Singh	JD(U)	Kangabam Jadu Singh
33	Heirok	5 March 2022	BJP	Thokchom Radheshyam Singh	INC	Moirangthem Okendro	NPP	Ningthoujam Diten Singh		
34	Wangjing Tentha	5 March 2022	BJP	Paonam Brojen	INC	M. Hemanta Singh	NPP	Usham Manglem Singh		
35	Khangabok	5 March 2022	BJP	Khundrakpam Menjor Mangang	INC	Surjakumar Okram			JD(U)	Thokchom Jadumani Singh
36	Wabgai	5 March 2022	BJP	Usham Deben Singh	INC	Md. Fajur Rahim	NPP	Mayengbam Ranjit Singh	JD(U)	Md. Sikander Ali
37	Kakching	5 March 2022	BJP	Yengkhom Surchandra Singh	INC	Kshetrimayum Kennedy Singh (Note: INC and CPI will have a friendly contest on Kakching constituency)	NPP	Mayanglambam Rameswhar Singh	JD(U)	Naorem Nabachandra Singh
37	Kakching	5 March 2022	BJP	Yengkhom Surchandra Singh	CPI	Yengkhom Roma Devi	NPP	Mayanglambam Rameswhar Singh	JD(U)	Naorem Nabachandra Singh
38	Hiyanglam	5 March 2022	BJP	Yumnam Radheshyam	INC	Dr. Huidrom Jiten Singh	NPP	Maibam Dhanabir Singh	JD(U)	Elangbam Dwijamani Singh
39	Sugnu	5 March 2022	BJP	M. Binod Singh	INC	Kangujam Ranjit Singh				
Jiribam District
40	Jiribam	5 March 2022	BJP	Jiri Budhachandra Singh	INC	Badrur Rahman	NPP	Makakmayum Abbas Khan	JD(U)	Ashab Uddin
Chandel and Tengnoupal Districts
41	Chandel (ST)	5 March 2022	BJP	S. S. Olish			NPP	Lunkhopao Haokip		
42	Tengnoupal (ST)	5 March 2022	BJP	Letpao Haokip	INC	Wairok Morung Makunga				
Ukhrul District
43	Phungyar (ST)	5 March 2022	BJP	A. S. Hopingson	INC	Victor Keishing			JD(U)	Wungnaoshang Kasar
44	Ukhrul (ST)	5 March 2022	BJP	Shomtal Shaiza	INC	Alfred Kanngam S Arthur				
45	Chingai (ST)	5 March 2022	BJP	M. K. Preshaw Shimray	INC	Sword Vashum	NPP	Ningam Chamroy		
Senapati District
46	Karong (ST)	5 March 2022	BJP	R. U. Jonathan Tao	INC	D.D. Thaisii				
47	Mao (ST)	5 March 2022	BJP	S. Alexander Maikho						
48	Tadubi (ST)	5 March 2022	BJP	O. Lorho			NPP	N. Kayisii		
Kangpokpi District
49	Saikul (ST)	28 February 2022	BJP	Yamthong Haokip	INC	Lhingkim Haokip	NPP	Seikholal Haokip	JD(U)	Ch. Ajang Khongsai
50	Kangpokpi	28 February 2022	BJP	Nemcha Kipgen	INC	Ngamkhohen Kipgen			JD(U)	Soshim Gurung
51	Saitu (ST)	28 February 2022	BJP	Ngamthang Haokip	INC	Lamtinthang Haokip	NPP	K Lhouvum	JD(U)	L Johny Gangmei
Tamenglong and Noney Districts
52	Tamei (ST)	5 March 2022	BJP	Wilubou Newmal	INC	G.N. Kumuiteung	NPP	Kikhonbou Newmai		
53	Tamenglong (ST)	5 March 2022	BJP	Huri Golmei			NPP	Janghemlung Panmei	JD(U)	Samuel Jendai
54	Nungba (ST)	5 March 2022	BJP	Dingenglung Gangmei	INC	Gaikhangam Gangmei				
Pherzawl District
55	Tipaimukh (ST)	28 February 2022	BJP	Chaltonlien Amo			NPP	Thangthatling Sinate	JD(U)	Ngursanglur Sanate
56	Thanlon (ST)	28 February 2022	BJP	Vungzagin Valte			NPP	Khanthang Tonsing	JD(U)	Thangkhosei Guite
Churachandpur District
57	Henglep (ST)	28 February 2022	BJP	Letzamang Haokip	INC	T. Manga Vaiphei	NPP	Nehminthang Haokip	JD(U)	Genneikhup Vaiphei
58	Churachandpur (ST)	28 February 2022	BJP	V. Hangkhanlian	INC	H. Mangchinkhup Paite	NPP	Th.Thangzalian	JD(U)	Lallian Mang Khaute
59	Saikot (ST)	28 February 2022	BJP	Paolienlal Haokip	INC	T. N. Haokip	NPP	Khaipao Haokip	JD(U)	John H Pulamte
60	Singhat (ST)	28 February 2022	BJP	Ginsuanhau Zou	INC	Tuankhan Kiamlo Hangzo			JD(U)	Hangkhanpau Taithul

== Voter turnout ==
Phase	Date	Seats	Districts	District Turnout (%)	Phase Turnout (%)
I	28 February 2022	38	Bishnupur	91.11	88.69
I	28 February 2022	38	Pherzawl–Churachandpur	79.65	88.69
I	28 February 2022	38	Imphal East	90.55	88.69
I	28 February 2022	38	Imphal West	90.80	88.69
I	28 February 2022	38	Kangpokpi	90.14	88.69
II	5 March 2022	22	Chandel–Tengnoupal	93.94	89.06
II	5 March 2022	22	Jiribam	90.26	89.06
II	5 March 2022	22	Senapati	88.16	89.06
II	5 March 2022	22	Tamenglong–Noney	86.50	89.06
II	5 March 2022	22	Thoubal–Kakching	91.09	89.06
II	5 March 2022	22	Ukhrul	83.46	89.06
Total		60			

== Results ==
=== Results by alliance and party ===
Vote Share by alliance
1. BJP (37.8%)
2. NPP (17.3%)
3. MPSA (16.9%)
4. JD(U) (10.8%)
5. NPF (8.09%)
6. IND (5.08%)
7. Other (4.04%)
Seat Share
1. BJP (53.3%)
2. NPP (11.7%)
3. JD(U) (10.0%)
4. MPSA (8.33%)
5. NPF (8.33%)
6. KPA (3.33%)
7. IND (5.00%)

Alliance	Party	Popular vote			Seats		
Alliance	Party	Votes	%	±pp	Contested	Won	+/−
None	Bharatiya Janata Party	720,702	37.83	▲2.73	60	32	▲11
None	National People's Party	321,303	17.3	▲12.19	38	7	▲3
MPSA	Indian National Congress	312,705	16.83	▼18.57	53	5	▼23
MPSA	Communist Party of India	1,032	0.06	▼0.68	2	0	Steady
MPSA	Total	322,691	16.89	▼19.25	54 (Note: INC and CPI have a friendly fight in one constituency.)	5	▼23
None	Janata Dal (United)	200,103	10.77	New	38	6	New
None	Naga People's Front	150,209	8.09	▲0.89	9	5	▲1
None	Republican Party of India	255,111	1.37		9	-	
None	Kuki People's Alliance	18,808	1.01		2	2	▲2
None	Independents	94,333	5.08			3	▲2
None	NOTA		0.56				
Total		18,57,448	100			60	
Valid votes							
Invalid votes							
Votes cast/ turnout							
Abstentions							
Registered voters							

=== Results by district ===
District	Seats						
District	Seats	BJP	NPP	JDU	MPS	NPF	OTH
Imphal East	11	7	1	2	1	—N/a	—N/a
Imphal West	13	10	1	1	—N/a	—N/a	1
Bishnupur	6	4	2	—N/a	—N/a	—N/a	—N/a
Thoubal–Kakching	10	4	1	1	4	—N/a	—N/a
Chandel–Tengnoupal	2	2	—N/a	—N/a	—N/a	—N/a	—N/a
Ukhrul	3	—N/a	—N/a	—N/a	—N/a	3	—N/a
Senapati–Kangpokpi	6	1	1	—N/a	—N/a	1	3
Tamenglong	3	1	1	—N/a	—N/a	1	—N/a
Pherzawl–Churachandpur	6	3	—N/a	2	—N/a	—N/a	1
Total	60	32	7	6	5	5	5

=== Results by constituency ===
Constituency		Winner				Runner-up				Margin
#	Name	Candidate	Party	Votes	%	Candidate	Party	Votes	%	Margin
Imphal East District
1	Khundrakpam	Thokchom Lokeshwar Singh	INC	12211	49.02	Thangjam Mohendro Singh	BJP	11996	48.16	215
2	Heingang	N. Biren Singh	BJP	24814	78.54	Pangeijam Saratchandra Singh	INC	6543	20.71	18271
3	Khurai	Leishangthem Susindro Meitei	BJP	11131	33.62	Laitonjam Jayananda Singh	NPP	8767	26.86	2364
4	Kshetrigao	Sheikh Noorul Hassan	NPP	13118	38.47	Nahakpam Indrajit Singh	BJP	12376	36.29	742
5	Thongju	Thongam Biswajit Singh	BJP	15338	51.98	Seram Neken Singh	INC	8649	29.31	6689
6	Keirao	Lourembam Rameshwor Meetei	BJP	17335	61.68	Md. Nasiruddin Khan	NPP	9126	32.47	8209
7	Andro	Thounaojam Shyamkumar	BJP	16739	50.08	Lourembam Sanjoy Singh	NPP	15282	45.72	1457
8	Lamlai	Khongbantabam Ibomcha	BJP	10105	35.25	Kshetrimayum Biren Singh	JD(U)	9984	34.83	121
Imphal West District
9	Thangmeiband	Khumukcham Joykishan	JD(U)	13629	56.08	Jyotin Walkhom	BJP	9856	40.56	3773
10	Uripok	Khwairakpam Raghumani Singh	BJP	8335	36.17	Yumnam Joykumar Singh	NPP	7426	32.23	909
11	Sagolband	Rajkumar Imo Singh	BJP	11054	54.6	Dr. Khwairakpam Loken Singh	JD(U)	8398	41.48	2656
12	Keishamthong	Sapam Nishikant Singh	IND	8874	35	Maheshwar Thounaojam	RPI(A)	8687	34.27	187
13	Singjamei	Yumnam Khemchand Singh	BJP	8709	45.8	Oinam Romen Singh	JD(U)	6414	33.73	2295
Imphal East District
14	Yaiskul	Thokchom Satyabarta Singh	BJP	9724	40.25	Huidrom Vikramjit Singh	NPP	9092	37.64	632
15	Wangkhei	Thangjam Arunkumar	JD(U)	11593	35.71	Okram Henry	BJP	10840	33.39	753
Imphal West District
16	Sekmai (SC)	Heikham Dingo Singh	BJP	10010	36.8	Ayangbam Oken Singh	NPP	6677	24.55	3333
17	Lamsang	Sorokhaibam Rajen	BJP	15185	47.8	Pukhrambam Sumati Devi	NPP	14785	46.54	400
18	Konthoujam	Sapam Ranjan Singh	BJP	13432	47.3	Konthoujam Sharat Singh	NPP	13038	45.91	394
19	Patsoi	Sapam Keba	BJP	12186	34.98	Akoijam Mirabai Devi	INC	11499	33.01	687
20	Langthabal	Karam Shyam	BJP	10815	41.17	O. Joy Singh	INC	8762	33.36	2053
21	Naoriya Pakhanglakpa	Soraisam Kebi Devi	BJP	11058	33.55	Soibam Subhaschandra Singh	NPP	10527	31.93	531
22	Wangoi	Khuraijam Loken Singh	NPP	15606	55.29	Oinam Lukhoi Singh	BJP	12340	43.72	3266
23	Mayang Imphal	Kongkham Robindro Singh	BJP	14642	47.73	Dr Kh Ratankumar Singh	INC	8513	27.75	6129
Bishnupur District
24	Nambol	Thounaojam Basanta Kumar Singh	BJP	16885	54.76	Nameirakpam Loken Singh	INC	13825	44.84	3060
25	Oinam	Irengbam Nalini Devi	NPP	10808	40.57	Laishram Radhakishore Singh	BJP	10366	38.91	442
26	Bishnupur	Govindas Konthoujam	BJP	13611	46.05	Oinam Nabakishore Singh	JD(U)	12202	41.28	1409
27	Moirang	Thongam Shanti Singh	NPP	14349	39.75	M. Prithviraj Singh	BJP	12118	33.57	2231
28	Thanga	Tongbram Robindro Singh	BJP	13095	61.96	Birla Haobijam	INC	7844	37.11	5251
29	Kumbi	Sanasam Premachandra Singh	BJP	8513	32.63	Ahanthem Shanjoy Singh	JD(U)	8141	31.21	372
Thoubal and Kakching Districts
30	Lilong	Muhammad Abdul Nasir	JD(U)	16886	49.71	Y. Antas Khan	BJP	16316	48.03	570
31	Thoubal	Okram Ibobi Singh	INC	15085	51	Leitanthem Basanta Singh	BJP	12542	42.4	2543
32	Wangkhem	Keisham Meghachandra Singh	INC	8889	29.36	Yumnam Nabachandra Singh	BJP	7597	25.09	1292
33	Heirok	Thokchom Radheshyam Singh	BJP	13589	42.8	Moirangthem Okendro	INC	13186	41.53	403
34	Wangjing Tentha	Paonam Brojen	BJP	15765	51.69	M. Hemanta Singh	INC	13852	45.42	1913
35	Khangabok	Surjakumar Okram	INC	17435	49.76	Khundrakpam Menjor Mangang	BJP	9632	27.49	7803
36	Wabgai	Usham Deben Singh	BJP	9138	31.13	Md. Fajur Rahim	INC	9088	30.96	50
37	Kakching	Mayanglambam Rameshwar Singh	NPP	8546	31.49	Yengkhom Surchandra Singh	BJP	7341	27.05	1205
38	Hiyanglam	Yumnam Radheshyam	BJP	8613	32.8	Dr. Huidrom Jiten Singh	INC	6584	25.07	2029
39	Sugnu	Kangujam Ranjit Singh	INC	12673	50.63	M. Binod Singh	BJP	11657	46.57	1016
Jiribam District
40	Jiribam	Achab Uddin	JD(U)	12313	46.21	Nameirakpam Budhachandra Singh	BJP	11897	44.65	416
Chandel and Tengnoupal Districts
41	Chandel (ST)	SS Olish	BJP	37066	78.06	Langhu Paulhring Anal	NPF	9725	20.74	27341
42	Tengnoupal (ST)	Letpao Haokip	BJP	21597	55.38	D. Korungthang	NPF	14115	36.19	7482
Ukhrul District
43	Phungyar (ST)	Leishyo Keishing	NPF	11642	37.75	Awung Hopingson	BJP	10863	35.23	779
44	Ukhrul (ST)	Ram Muivah	NPF	15503	38.69	Alfred Kan-Ngam Arthur	INC	14561	36.34	942
45	Chingai (ST)	Khashim Vashum	NPF	12837	31.39	Ningam Chamroy	NPP	10501	25.68	2336
Senapati District
46	Karong (ST)	J. Kumo Sha	IND	16452	34.2	R. Jonathan Tao	BJP	13566	28.2	2886
47	Mao (ST)	Loshi Dikho	NPF	29591	58.05	Woba Joram	IND	21078	41.35	8513
48	Tadubi (ST)	N. Kayisii	NPP	21289	47.7	Francis Ngajokpa	NPF	20821	46.65	549
Kangpokpi District
49	Saikul (ST)	Kimneo Haokip Hangshing	KPA	6710	25.38	Kenn Raikhan	IND	5461	20.66	1249
50	Kangpokpi	Nemcha Kipgen	BJP	14412	57.37	Soshim Gurung	JD(U)	9016	35.89	5396
51	Saitu (ST)	Haokholet Kipgen	IND	12546	31.52	Ngamthang Haokip	BJP	9762	24.71	2694
Tamenglong and Noney Districts
52	Tamei (ST)	Awangbow Newmai	NPF	19643	50.83	Z. Newmai	NPP	17945	46.44	1698
53	Tamenglong (ST)	Jenghemlung Panmei	NPP	10456	34.11	Huri Golmei	BJP	9156	29.84	1309
54	Nungba (ST)	Dipu Gangmei	BJP	14464	57.39	Gaikhangam	INC	10678	42.37	3786
Pherzawl District
55	Tipaimukh (ST)	Ngursanglur Sanate	JD(U)	6267	49.24	Chalton Lien Amo	BJP	5018	39.42	1249
56	Thanlon (ST)	Vungzagin Valte	BJP	4863	36.45	Khantang Taosing	NPP	4112	30.82	751
Churachandpur District
57	Henglep (ST)	Letzamang Haokip	BJP	13897	50.36	T. Manga Vaiphei	INC	6049	21.92	7848
58	Churachandpur (ST)	L. M. Khaute	JD(U)	19231	38.24	V. Hangkhanlian	BJP	17607	36.93	624
59	Saikot (ST)	Paolienlal Haokip	BJP	18457	35.1	Khaipao Haokip	NPP	12586	23.93	5871
60	Singhat (ST)	Chinlunthang	KPA	12098	51.19	Ginshuanhau Zhao	BJP	10179	43.07	1919

== See also ==
- 2022 elections in India
- Elections in Manipur
