= First N. Biren Singh ministry =

Indian ministry

- Ministry of Manipur
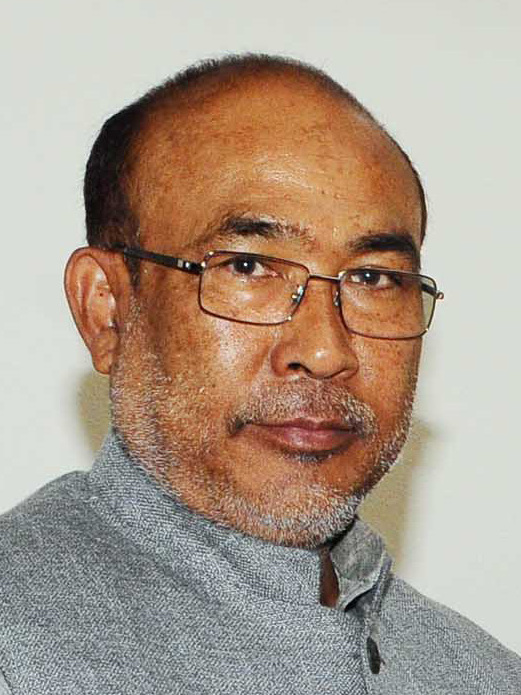
- N. Biren Singh, Hon'ble Chief Minister of Manipur
- Date formed: 15 March 2017
- Date dissolved: 21 March 2022

People and organisations
- Head of state: Governor; La. Ganesan
- Head of government: N. Biren Singh
- No. of ministers: 10
- Ministers removed: 1
- Member parties: BJP; NPP; NPF
- Status in legislature: Coalition

History
- Election: 2017
- Legislature term: 5 years
- Predecessor: Third Ibobi Singh ministry
- Successor: Second Biren Singh ministry

The Cabinet of the state of Manipur, India, forms the executives branch of the Government of Manipur.

This is a list of minister from N. Biren Singh cabinets starting from 15 March 2017. N. Biren Singh is the leader of BJP, who was sworn in the Chief Ministers of Manipur on 15 March 2017. Here is the list of the ministers of his ministry.

== Council of Ministers ==
S.No	Name	Constituency	Department	Party
1.	N. Biren Singh; Chief Minister	Heingang	Home.; Personnel.; Planning.; Revenue.; Other departments not allocated to any Minister.	BJP
Deputy Chief Minister
2.	Y. Joykumar Singh	Uripok	Finance.; Science & Technology.; Economics and Statistics.; Civil Aviation.	NPP
Cabinet Ministers
3.	Thongam Biswajit Singh	Thongju	Public Works Department.; Rural Development.; Panchayati Raj.; Commerce & Industries.; Power.; Administrative Reforms & Training.; Information & Public Relations.	BJP
4.	Losi Dikho	Mao	Public Health Engineering.; Printing & Stationery.	NPF
5.	Shorokhaibam Rajen	Lamsang	Education.; Fisheries.; CADA.	BJP
6.	Letpao Haokip	Chandel	Youth Affairs &Sports.; Irrigation & Flood Control.	NPP
7.	Vungzagin Valte	Thanlon	Transport.; Tribal Affairs & Hills.; General Administration.	BJP
8.	Awangbow Newmai	Tamei	Forest.; Environment.; Climate change.; Sericulture.	NPF
9.	Oinam Lukhoi Singh	Wangoi	Agriculture.; Veterinary & Animal Husbandry.; Tourism.	BJP
10.	Thokchom Satyabrata Singh	Yaiskul	Consumer Affairs.; Food and Public Distribution.; Law and Legislature Affairs.; Labour & Employment.	BJP

=== Former Members ===
SI No.	Name	Constituency	Department	Tenure	Party	Reason
1.	Thounaojam Shyamkumar	Andro	Minister of Forest & Environment, Horticulture & Soil Conservation, Town Planning and MAHUD.	March 2017 – March 2020	BJP	Disqualified by the Supreme Court of India
2.	Nemcha Kipgen	Kangpokpi	Social Welfare.; Cooperation.	March 2017 – September 2020	BJP	Removed
3.	Thokchom Radheshyam Singh	Heirok	Education.; Labour & Employment.	March 2017 – September 2020	BJP	Removed
4.	V. Hangkhanlian	Churachandpur	Agriculture.; Veterinary & Animal Husbandry.	March 2017 – September 2020	BJP	Removed
5.	N. Kayishii	Tadubi	Tribal & Hill Areas Development.; Fisheries.	March 2017 – September 2020	NPP	Removed
6.	L. Jayantakumar Singh	Keishamthong	Health & Family Welfare.; Law & Legislative Affairs.; Arts &Culture.; CADA.	March 2017 – September 2020	NPP	Removed
7.	Karam Shyam	Langthabal	PDS and Consumer Affairs.; Weights & Measures.; Revenue.; Relief & Rehabilitation.	March 2017 – September 2020	LJP	Removed
8.	Okram Henry Singh		Municipal Administration, Housing and Urban Development.; Social Welfare.; Cooperation.	September 2020 – March 2021	BJP	Due to Article 164(4) of Indian Constitution.

== See also ==
- Government of Manipur
  - Directorate of Language Planning and Implementation
- Manipur Legislative Assembly
- Second Biren Singh ministry
