= Yumnam Khemchand Singh ministry =

Government of Manipur, India since 2026

- Ministry of Manipur
- Yumnam Khemchand Singh
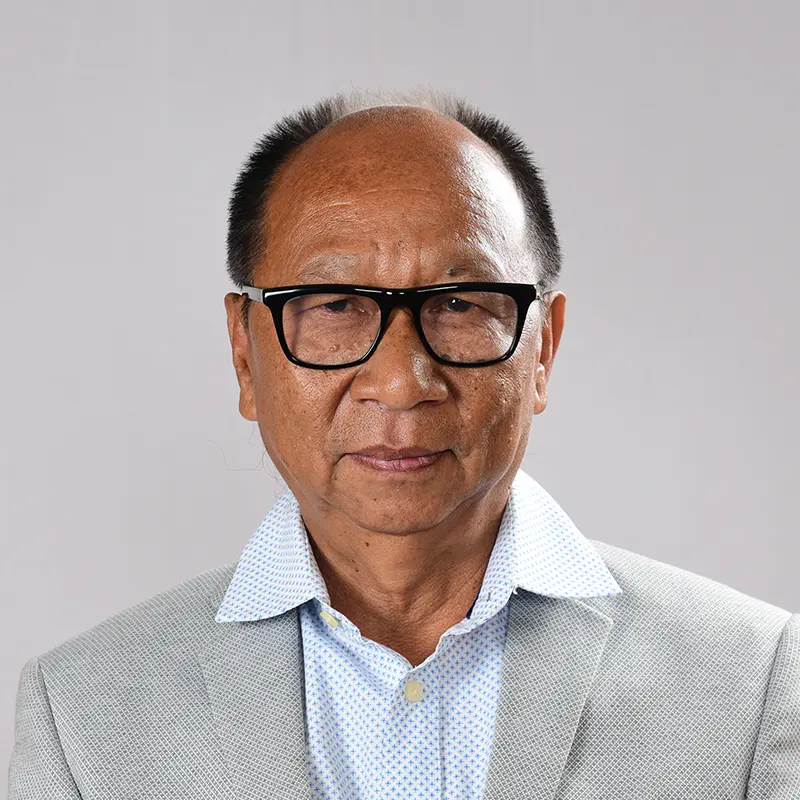
- Yumnam Khemchand Singh; Hon'ble Chief Minister of Manipur
- Date formed: 4 February 2026

People and organisations
- Governor: Ajay Kumar Bhalla
- Chief Minister: Yumnam Khemchand Singh (BJP)
- Deputy Chief Minister: Nemcha Kipgen (BJP); Losii Dikho (NPF)
- Member parties: BJP; NPP; NPF; JD(U)
- Status in legislature: Majority

History
- Election: 28 February–5 March 2022
- Legislature terms: 4 years, 158 days
- Predecessor: Second N. Biren Singh ministry

The cabinet of the state of Manipur, India, forms the executive branch of the Government of Manipur. Yumnam Khemchand Singh of the Bharatiya Janata Party was sworn in as the Chief Minister of Manipur on 4 February 2026.

== Council of Ministers ==
Portfolio	Minister	Took office	Left office	Party
Chief Minister; Finance, Personnel & Administrative Reforms, Planning, GAD, Vigilance, IT, and other departments not assigned.	Yumnam Khemchand Singh	4 February 2026	Incumbent	BJP
Deputy Chief Minister; Rural Development & Panchayati Raj, Tribal Affairs & Hills	Nemcha Kipgen	4 February 2026	Incumbent	BJP
Deputy Chief Minister; Public Health Engineering (PHED), Forest, Environment & Climate Change	Losii Dikho	4 February 2026	Incumbent	NPF
Minister of Home Affairs, Youth Affairs & Sports	Govindas Konthoujam	4 February 2026	Incumbent	BJP
Minister of Arts & Culture, Tourism	Khuraijam Loken Singh	4 February 2026	Incumbent	NPP
