= Ningthoujam Mangi Singh =

Indian politician

Ningthoujam Mangi Singh is an Indian politician from Manipur. He previously served as a Member of the Manipur Legislative Assembly representing Kumbi.

== Career ==
In 1990, Mangi was elected to the Manipur Legislative Assembly as a Communist Party of India candidate. He retained the seat in the 1995 Manipur Legislative Assembly election. In 2000 he lost the seat to Sanasam Bira Singh of the Manipur State Congress Party. In the 2002 Manipur Legislative Assembly election he regained the seat and was appointed Minister of Commerce and Industries, Sericulture, Eco.& Stat. in the first Okram Ibobi ministry. He was again elected in the 2007 Manipur Legislative Assembly election. In 2018 he joined the Indian National Congress.

In the 2022 Manipur Legislative Assembly election he contested as a National People's Party candidate but lost to Sanasam Premachandra Singh.
