= Govindas Konthoujam =

Indian politician (born 1963)

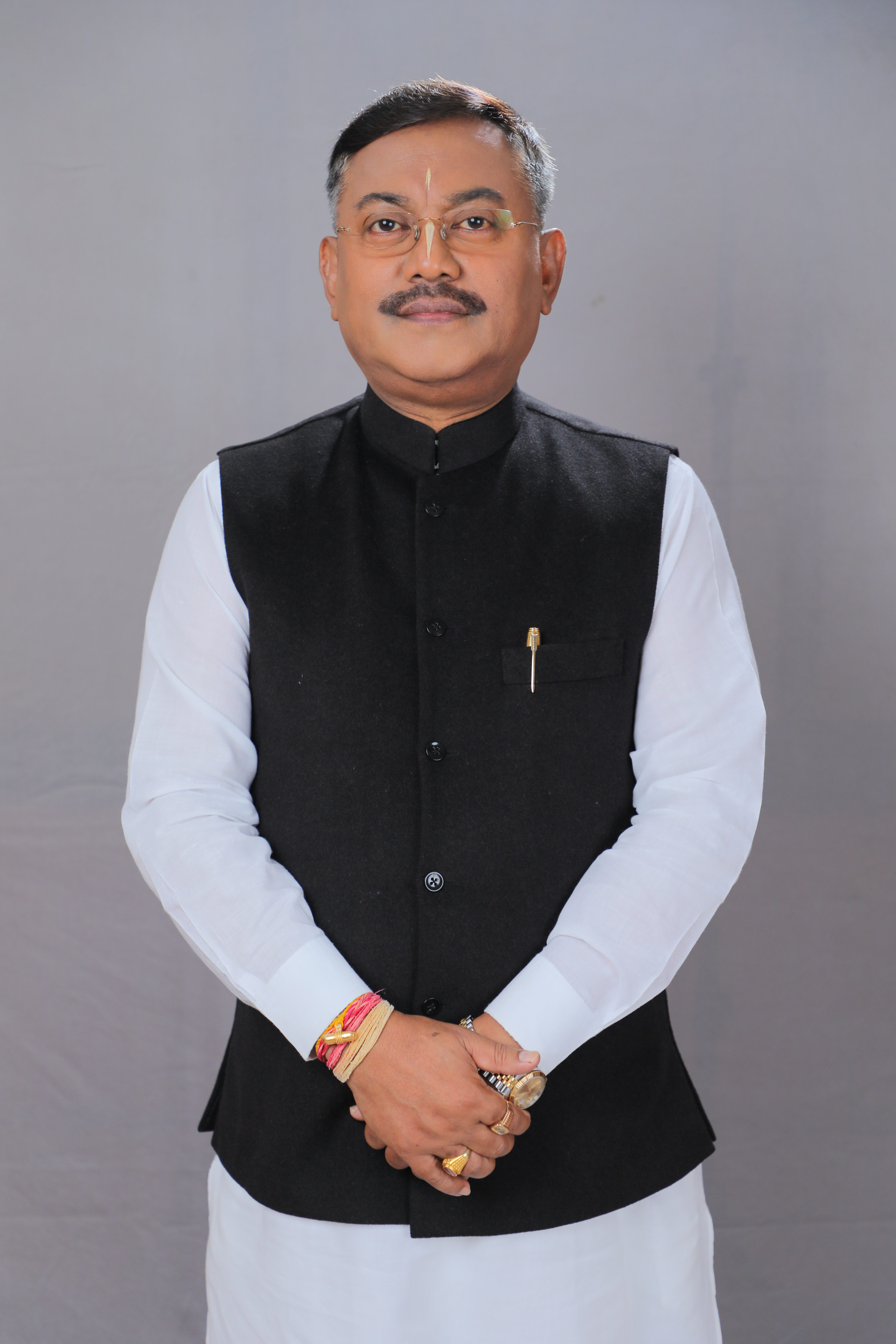
- Official portrait, 2022

Minister of Home Affairs of Manipur
- Incumbent
- Assumed office 4 February 2026
- Chief Minister: Yumnam Khemchand Singh
- Preceded by: N. Biren Singh

Member of Manipur Legislative Assembly
- Incumbent
- Assumed office 1995
- Preceded by: Khundrakpam Jibon Singh
- Constituency: Bishnupur

Personal details
- Born: 1 February 1963 (age 63) Ningthoukhong, Manipur, India
- Party: Bharatiya Janata Party
- Other political affiliations: Indian National Congress
- Education: Bachelor of Arts
- Alma mater: Chanambam Ibomcha College
- Profession: Social worker

Govindas Konthoujam Singh (born 1 February 1963) is an Indian politician from Manipur and member of the Bharatiya Janata Party. He was elected for the seventh time in a row as a member of the Manipur Legislative Assembly from Bishnupur constituency in Bishnupur District from the Bharatiya Janata Party in the 2022 Manipur Legislative Assembly election. Singh is the current Home, Sports and Youth affairs Minister of Manipur in Yumnam Khemchand Singh's cabinet. Singh was the Minister for PWD, Department of Youth Affairs & Sports in the Second N. Biren Singh ministry.

He joined Bharatiya Janata Party in the presence of Sambit Patra and Chief Minister of Manipur N. Biren Singh after resigning from Indian National Congress. He was the chief whip of the Congress Legislature Party. Konthoujam was also the Manipur Pradesh Congress Committee President from December 2020 to July 2021.
