= Kuki People's Alliance =

- Abbreviation: KPA
- Leader: Tongmang Haokip
- General Secretary: WL Hangshing
- Founder: Tongmang Haokip and WL Hangshing
- Founded: 12 January 2022; 4 years ago
- Ideology: Kuki-Chin-Mizo Interests; Conservatism
- Political position: Centre-right
- ECI status: Registered
- Alliance: National Democratic Alliance (2022-2023)
- Seats in Rajya Sabha: 0 / 245
- Seats in Lok Sabha: 0 / 543
- Seats in Manipur Legislative Assembly: 2 / 60

Election symbol
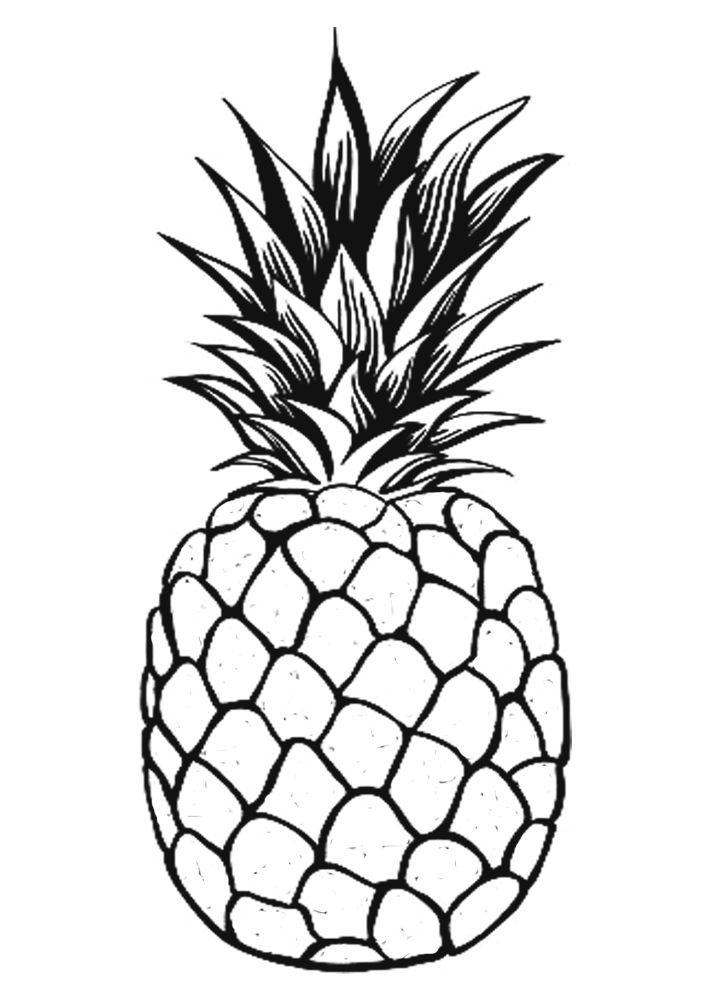

The Kuki People's Alliance (abbreviated as KPA) is an Indian state-level political party in Manipur. The party has 2 MLAs in Manipur Legislative Assembly, making it the largest and only opposition party in Manipur after Indian National Congress.

== History ==
KPA was formed by former Indian Foreign Service officer Tongmang Haokip and Wilson L Hangshing on 12 January 2022.

== Electoral performance ==
The party won 2 seats in the 2022 Manipur Legislative Assembly election. The KPA is mainly based on the interests of the Kuki people. KPA supported BJP in Manipur and became an ally of BJP in its government. KPA withdrew support from Biren Singh government in August 2023 citing the reason as failure of NDA government in 2023 Manipur violence.
