= Second N. Biren Singh ministry =

Government of Manipur India from 2022 to 2025

- Ministry of Manipur
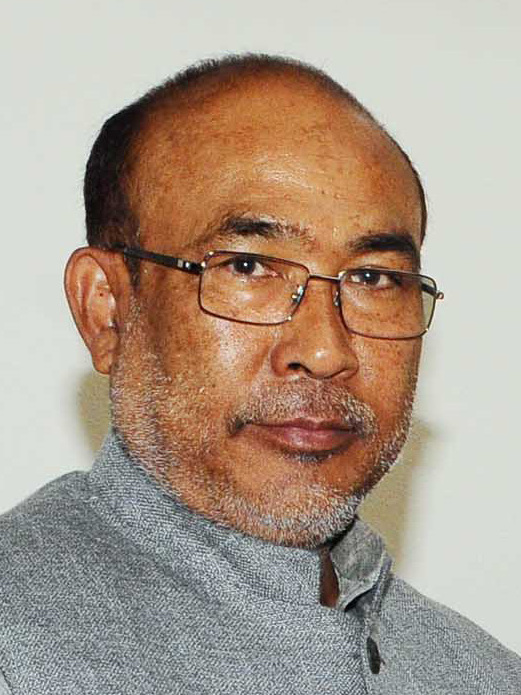
- N. Biren Singh, Chief Minister of Manipur
- Date formed: 21 March 2022
- Date dissolved: 13 February 2025

People and organisations
- Governor: La. Ganesan (2022–2023); Anusuiya Uikey (2023–2024); Lakshman Acharya (2024–2025)
- Chief Minister: N. Biren Singh
- Member parties: Bharatiya Janata Party; Naga People's Front
- Status in legislature: Majority

History
- Election: 2022
- Legislature terms: 2 years, 329 days
- Predecessor: First N. Biren Singh ministry
- Successor: Yumnam Khemchand Singh ministry

The Cabinet of the state of Manipur, India, forms the executive branch of the Government of Manipur. Nongthombam Biren Singh of the Bharatiya Janata Party was sworn in as the Chief Minister of Manipur for the second term on 21 March 2022.

== Council of Ministers ==
| Portfolio | Minister | Took office | Left office | Party |
|---|---|---|---|---|
| Chief Minister; Home Affairs; Vigilance; Personnel & Administrative Reforms; Finance; Planning; Information & Technology; Other departments not allocated to any Minister | N. Biren Singh | 21 March 2022 | 13 February 2025 | BJP |
| Minister of Power, Environment, Forest & Climate Change, Agriculture, Science & Technology | Thongam Biswajit Singh | 21 March 2022 | 13 February 2025 | BJP |
| Municipal Administration, Housing & Urban Development (MAHUD), Rural Development & Panchayati Raj | Yumnam Khemchand Singh | 21 March 2022 | 13 February 2025 | BJP |
| Minister of Public Works Department, Youth Affairs & Sports | Govindas Konthoujam | 21 March 2022 | 13 February 2025 | BJP |
| Minister of Commerce & Industry, Textiles, Co-operation | Nemcha Kipgen | 21 March 2022 | 13 February 2025 | BJP |
| Minister of Water Resources, Relief & Disaster Management | Awangbow Newmai | 21 March 2022 | 13 February 2025 | NPF |
| Tribal Affairs & Hills Department, Horticulture & Soil Conservation Department | Letpao Haokip | 16 April 2022 | 13 February 2025 | BJP |
| Medical Health & Family Welfare Department, Publicity & Information Department | Sapam Ranjan Singh | 16 April 2022 | 13 February 2025 | BJP |
| Education Department, Law & Legislative Affairs Department | Thounaojam Basanta Kumar Singh | 16 April 2022 | 13 February 2025 | BJP |
| Public Health Engineering Department, Consumer Affairs, Food & Public Distribution Department | Leishangthem Susindro Meitei | 16 April 2022 | 13 February 2025 | BJP |
| Social Welfare Department, Skill, Labour, Employment & Entrepreneurship Department Fisheries Department | Heikham Dingo Singh | 16 April 2022 | 13 February 2025 | BJP |
| Animal Husbandary & Veternary Department, Transport Department | Khashim Vashum | 16 April 2022 | 13 February 2025 | NPF |
