= List of deputy chief ministers of Manipur =

Important member in state government

Deputy Chief Minister of Manipur
- Emblem of Manipur

- Incumbent; Nemcha Kipgen and Losii Dikho since 4 February 2026
- Type: Deputy Head of Government
- Status: Deputy Leader of the Executive
- Abbreviation: DCM
- Member of: Cabinet of Manipur; Manipur Legislative Assembly
- Nominator: Members of the Government of Manipur in Manipur Legislative Assembly
- Appointer: Governor of Manipur
- Term length: At the confidence of the assembly; Deputy Chief minister's term is for 5 years and is subject to no term limits.

The deputy chief minister of Manipur is a member of the Cabinet of Manipur Government in the Government of Manipur, in India. Not a constitutional office, it seldom carries any specific powers. In the parliamentary system of government, the chief minister is treated as the "first among equals" in the cabinet; the position of deputy chief minister is used to bring political stability and strength within a coalition government. The position of deputy chief minister is not explicitly defined or mentioned in the Constitution of India. However, the Supreme Court of India has stated that the appointment of deputy chief ministers is not unconstitutional. The court has clarified that a deputy chief minister, for all practical purposes, remains a minister in the council of ministers headed by the chief minister and does not draw a higher salary or perks compared to other ministers.During the absence of the chief minister, the deputy-chief minister may chair cabinet meetings and lead the assembly majority. Various deputy chief ministers have also taken the oath of secrecy in line with the one that chief minister takes. This oath has also sparked controversies.

== List of deputy chief ministers ==
Sr. No.	Name (constituency) (birth-death)	Portrait	Term of office			Political Party	Chief Minister	Ref
1	Dr. Leishangthem Chandramani Singh (Patsoi) (b. 1950)		16 December 1997	14 February 2001	3 years, 60 days	Manipur State Congress Party	Wahengbam Nipamacha Singh	
2	Gaikhangam Gangmei (Nungba) (b. 1950)		7 March 2012	15 March 2017	5 years, 8 days	Indian National Congress	Okram Ibobi Singh	
3	Y. Joykumar Singh (Uripok) (b. 1955)		15 March 2017	17 June 2020	3 years, 94 days	National People's Party	N. Biren Singh	
3	Y. Joykumar Singh (Uripok) (b. 1955)		5 July 2020	10 March 2022	1 year, 248 days	National People's Party	N. Biren Singh	
4	Nemcha Kipgen (Kangpokpi) (b.1965)		4 February 2026	Incumbent	234 days	Bharatiya Janata Party	Y. Khemchand Singh	
5	Losii Dikho (Mao) (b.1966)		4 February 2026	Incumbent	234 days	Naga People's Front	Y. Khemchand Singh	

== Statistics ==
#	Deputy Chief Minister	Party	Term of office	
#	Deputy Chief Minister	Party	Longest continuous term	Total duration of deputy chief ministership
1	Gaikhangam Gangmei	INC	5 years, 8 days	5 years, 8 days
2	Y. Joykumar Singh	NPP	3 years, 94 days	5 years, 7 days
3	Dr. Leishangthem Chandramani Singh	MSCP	3 years, 60 days	3 years, 60 days
4	Nemcha Kipgen	BJP	234 days	234 days
5	Losii Dikho	NPF	234 days	234 days

== Oath as the state deputy chief minister ==
The deputy chief minister serves five years in the office. The following is the oath of the Deputy chief minister of state:

I, <Name of Deputy Chief Minister>, do swear in the name of God/solemnly affirm that I will bear true faith and allegiance to the Constitution of India as by law established, that I will uphold the sovereignty and integrity of India, that I will faithfully and conscientiously discharge my duties as a Minister for the State of () and that I will do right to all manner of people in accordance with the Constitution and the law without fear or favour, affection or ill-will.

Oath of Secrecy

"I, [Name], do swear in the name of God / solemnly affirm that I will not directly or indirectly communicate or reveal to any person or persons any matter which shall be brought under my consideration or shall become known to me as a Minister for the State of [Name of State] except as may be required for the due discharge of my duties as such Minister.
