= Irengbam Nalini Devi =

Indian politician

Member of the Manipur Legislative Assembly

Irengbam Nalini Devi (born 1959) is an Indian politician from Manipur. She is an MLA of National People's Party from Oinam Assembly constituency in Bishnupur district. She is one of the five women elected to the 60-member Manipur Legislative Assembly in 2022, the highest representation of women MLAs in the state legislature in the history of Manipur.

== Early life and education ==
Nalini hails from Irengbam Awang Mamang, Nambol post office, Bishnupur district. She was married to two-time former MLA, Irengbam Ibohalbi Singh, a medical doctor, who died of COVID in 2021. She did her schooling at Oinam Girls High School, Oinam and her pre-university course at Imphal College. Later, she completed her Bachelor of Arts in 1979 from CI College, Bishnupur, which is affiliated to Gauhati University.

== Career ==
After the death of her husband in 2021, Nalini contested as MLA on a National People's Party ticket from Oinam and won for the first time the seat represented by her husband in 2012 and 2007. She won the 2022 Manipur Legislative Assembly election from Oinam Assembly constituency, defeating Laishram Radhakishore Singh of Bharatiya Janata Party by 442 votes. She polled 10,808 votes to 10,336 by Singh. In June 2023, she was part of the delegation of MLAs that met defence minister Rajnath Singh, urging the centre to put an end to the violence in Manipur.
