= Kumbi Assembly constituency =

Legislative Assembly constituency in Manipur State, India

Coordinates: 24.43°N 93.8°E

Kumbi
- Constituency No. 29 for the Manipur Legislative Assembly

Constituency details
- Country: India
- Region: Northeast India
- State: Manipur
- District: Bishnupur
- Lok Sabha constituency: Inner Manipur
- Established: 1972
- Total electors: 28,161
- Reservation: None

Member of Legislative Assembly
- 12th Manipur Legislative Assembly
- Incumbent Vacant

Kumbi Legislative Assembly constituency is one of the 60 Legislative Assembly constituencies of Manipur state in India.

It is part of Bishnupur district.

== Extent ==
Kumbi is 29th among the 60 state constituencies of Manipur. It consists of 35 parts namely: 1 - Phougakchao Ikhai (A), 2 - Phougakchao Ikhai (B), 3 - Torbung (A), 4 - Torbung (B), 5 - Nganukon Refugee Colony, 6 - Saiton (A), 7 - Saiton (B), 8 - Saiton (C-1), 9 - Saiton (C-2), 10 - Kumbi M.E. Leikai, 11 - Kumbi Ishing Chaiba, 12 - Kumbi (B-1), 13 - Kumbi (B-2), 14 - Kumbi Bazar, 15 - Kumbi Makha Leikai, 16 - Kumbi (D), 17 - Kumbi (E), 18 - Kumbi (F), 19 - Ithai (A), 20 - Ithai Wapokpi, 21 - Ithai (B), 22 - Wangoo (A), 23 - Wangoo (B), 24 - Wangoo (C), 25 - Wangoo (D), 26 - Wangoo Terakhong (A), 27 - Wangoo Terakhong (B), 28 - Haotak Tampha Khunou, 29 - Wangoo Sabal (A), 30 - Wangoo Sabal (B), 31 - Borayangbi (A), 32 - Borayangbi (B), 33 - Chairen Leingangtabi, 34 - Tangjeng Pombikhok(A), and 35 - Tangjeng Pombikhok(B).

== Members of the Legislative Assembly ==
Year	Winner	Party
1972	Mairembam Koireng	Indian National Congress
1974	Wahengbam Komol	Manipur Peoples Party
1980	Khangembam Manimohan	Indian National Congress
1984	Sanasam Bira	Independent politician
1990	Ningthoujam Mangi Singh	Communist Party of India
1995	Ningthoujam Mangi Singh	Communist Party of India
2000	Sanasam Bira	Manipur State Congress Party
2002	Ningthoujam Mangi Singh	Communist Party of India
2007	Ningthoujam Mangi Singh	Communist Party of India
2012	Sanasam Bira	Indian National Congress
2017	Sanasam Bira	Indian National Congress
2022	Sanasam Premachandra Singh	Bharatiya Janata Party

== Election results ==
Vote share of winning candidates
2022	32.63%
2017	49.91%
2012	40.07%
2007	33.38%
2002	27.02%
2000	25.72%
1995	23.79%
1990	25.25%
1984	20.76%
1980	23.24%
1974	55.76%
1972	30.24%

=== 2027 Assembly election ===
2027 Manipur Legislative Assembly election: Kumbi
Party	Candidate	Votes	%	±%
INC				
NDA				
NOTA	None of the above			
Majority				
Turnout				
gain from		Swing		

=== 2022 Assembly election ===
2022 Manipur Legislative Assembly election: Kumbi
Party	Candidate	Votes	%	±%
BJP	Sanasam Premchandra Singh	8,513	32.63%	−11.77%
JD(U)	Ahanthem Shanjoy Singh	8,141	31.21%	
NPP	Ningthoujam Mangi Singh	7,787	29.85%	
INC	Dr. Khangembam Romesh	1,169	4.48%	−45.43%
Independent	Naorem Sorojini Devi	330	1.26%	
NOTA	Nota	147	0.56%	
Margin of victory		372	1.43%	−4.08%
Turnout		26,087	92.64%	1.19%
Registered electors		28,161		8.18%
BJP gain from INC		Swing	-17.28%	

=== 2017 Assembly election ===
2017 Manipur Legislative Assembly election: Kumbi
Party	Candidate	Votes	%	±%
INC	Sanasam Bira	11,881	49.91%	9.84%
BJP	Ningthoujam Mangi	10,570	44.40%	40.37%
LJP	Ningombam Ibohal Meitei	1,057	4.44%	
Manipur National Democratic Front	Wahengbam Bobbyjames Singh	180	0.76%	
Margin of victory		1,311	5.51%	0.76%
Turnout		23,805	91.45%	5.62%
Registered electors		26,032		4.43%
INC hold		Swing	9.84%	

=== 2012 Assembly election ===
2012 Manipur Legislative Assembly election: Kumbi
Party	Candidate	Votes	%	±%
INC	Sanasam Bira	8,572	40.07%	14.52%
CPI	Ningthoujam Mangi	7,557	35.32%	1.94%
AITC	Dr. Khangembam Romesh	4,296	20.08%	
BJP	Khangembam Manimohan	862	4.03%	
MPP	Aheibam Angousana	108	0.50%	−24.48%
Margin of victory		1,015	4.74%	−3.09%
Turnout		21,395	85.83%	−2.39%
Registered electors		24,928		−0.37%
INC gain from CPI		Swing	6.68%	

=== 2007 Assembly election ===
2007 Manipur Legislative Assembly election: Kumbi
Party	Candidate	Votes	%	±%
CPI	Ningthoujam Mangi	7,368	33.38%	6.36%
INC	Sanasam Bira	5,639	25.55%	9.73%
MPP	Aheibam Angousana	5,515	24.99%	
NCP	Khangembam Manimohan	3,441	15.59%	
Margin of victory		1,729	7.83%	4.53%
Turnout		22,072	88.21%	−0.47%
Registered electors		25,021		14.99%
CPI hold		Swing	6.36%	

=== 2002 Assembly election ===
2002 Manipur Legislative Assembly election: Kumbi
Party	Candidate	Votes	%	±%
CPI	Ningthoujam Mangi Singh	5,148	27.02%	1.73%
BJP	Aheibam Angousana	4,518	23.72%	1.04%
MSCP	Sanasam Bira	4,173	21.91%	−3.82%
INC	Ningthoujam Ibobi	3,014	15.82%	
FPM	Khangembam Manimohan	1,810	9.50%	−8.74%
SAP	Wahengbam Kamal	293	1.54%	−3.02%
Margin of victory		630	3.31%	2.88%
Turnout		19,050	88.68%	−3.98%
Registered electors		21,759		3.40%
CPI gain from MSCP		Swing	3.24%	

=== 2000 Assembly election ===
2000 Manipur Legislative Assembly election: Kumbi
Party	Candidate	Votes	%	±%
MSCP	Sanasam Bira	4,777	25.72%	
CPI	Ningthoujam Mangi	4,698	25.30%	1.51%
BJP	Aheibam Angousana	4,212	22.68%	4.61%
FPM	Ningthoujam Ibobi	3,388	18.24%	
SAP	Khangembam Amrit Singh	847	4.56%	
NCP	Khangembam Manimohan	586	3.16%	
Margin of victory		79	0.43%	−3.19%
Turnout		18,571	89.10%	−3.56%
Registered electors		21,044		10.49%
MSCP gain from CPI		Swing	1.94%	

=== 1995 Assembly election ===
1995 Manipur Legislative Assembly election: Kumbi
Party	Candidate	Votes	%	±%
CPI	Ningthoujam Mangi	4,164	23.79%	−1.46%
INC	Sanasam Bira	3,531	20.17%	−3.01%
BJP	Aheibam Angousana	3,164	18.07%	5.18%
Independent	Khangembam Manimohan	2,603	14.87%	
MPP	Wahengbam Komol	2,199	12.56%	−6.12%
JD	Ningthoujam Ibobi	1,844	10.53%	
Margin of victory		633	3.62%	1.55%
Turnout		17,505	92.66%	6.68%
Registered electors		19,046		8.60%
CPI hold		Swing	-1.46%	

=== 1990 Assembly election ===
1990 Manipur Legislative Assembly election: Kumbi
Party	Candidate	Votes	%	±%
CPI	Ningthoujam Mangi	3,758	25.25%	9.54%
INC	Sanasam Bira	3,451	23.19%	6.95%
JD	Khangembam Manimohan	2,903	19.50%	
MPP	Wahengbam Komol	2,781	18.68%	
BJP	Aheibam Angousana	1,919	12.89%	12.19%
Margin of victory		307	2.06%	−2.46%
Turnout		14,884	85.98%	−3.97%
Registered electors		17,537		21.91%
CPI gain from Independent		Swing	4.49%	

=== 1984 Assembly election ===
1984 Manipur Legislative Assembly election: Kumbi
Party	Candidate	Votes	%	±%
Independent	Sanasam Bira	2,615	20.76%	
INC	Khangembam Manimohan	2,045	16.23%	
CPI	Ningthoujam Mangi Singh	1,979	15.71%	−6.62%
Independent	Ningthoujam Ibobi	1,510	11.99%	
Independent	Aheibam Angousana	1,493	11.85%	
Independent	W. Komol Singh	1,381	10.96%	
JP	Nongmaithem Chhatra Singh	671	5.33%	
Independent	Abdul Satar	304	2.41%	
Independent	Potsangbam Keli	287	2.28%	
IC(S)	Khangembam Tamulo	204	1.62%	
BJP	Lourembam Birendra Singh	89	0.71%	
Margin of victory		570	4.52%	4.46%
Turnout		12,598	89.95%	9.68%
Registered electors		14,385		−0.98%
Independent gain from INC(I)		Swing	-2.49%	

=== 1980 Assembly election ===
1980 Manipur Legislative Assembly election: Kumbi
Party	Candidate	Votes	%	±%
INC(I)	Khangembam Manimohan	2,650	23.24%	
INC(U)	Sanasam Bira	2,643	23.18%	
CPI	Ningthoujam Mangi	2,546	22.33%	
JP	Wahengbam Komol	1,887	16.55%	
Independent	Patsangoam Kelijao	1,034	9.07%	
Independent	Khangembam Tamulo	457	4.01%	
MPP	Naorem Tompok	101	0.89%	−54.87%
Independent	Tongbram Gourachand	83	0.73%	
Margin of victory		7	0.06%	−16.09%
Turnout		11,401	80.27%	−1.42%
Registered electors		14,527		30.53%
INC(I) gain from MPP		Swing	-32.52%	

=== 1974 Assembly election ===
1974 Manipur Legislative Assembly election: Kumbi
Party	Candidate	Votes	%	±%
MPP	Wahengbam Komol	4,951	55.76%	32.23%
INC	Mairembam Koireng	3,517	39.61%	9.37%
Independent	Patsangoam Kelijao	294	3.31%	
Independent	B. Kamdeb Sharma	117	1.32%	
Margin of victory		1,434	16.15%	15.42%
Turnout		8,879	81.69%	3.43%
Registered electors		11,129		−13.03%
MPP gain from INC		Swing	25.52%	

=== 1972 Assembly election ===
1972 Manipur Legislative Assembly election: Kumbi
Party	Candidate	Votes	%	±%
INC	Mairembam Koireng	2,961	30.24%	
Independent	Raidali	2,889	29.50%	
MPP	Wahegbam Kamal	2,304	23.53%	
CPI	Haojam Gulamjat	1,502	15.34%	
Independent	Thokchom Kambdeba	137	1.40%	
Margin of victory		72	0.74%	
Turnout		9,793	78.26%	
Registered electors		12,796		
INC win (new seat)				

== See also ==
- List of constituencies of the Manipur Legislative Assembly
- Bishnupur district
