= Andro Assembly constituency =

Legislative Assembly constituency in Manipur State, India

Coordinates: 24.73°N 94.04°E

Andro
- Constituency No. 7 for the Manipur Legislative Assembly

Constituency details
- Country: India
- Region: Northeast India
- State: Manipur
- District: Imphal East
- Lok Sabha constituency: Inner Manipur
- Established: 1974
- Total electors: 35,930
- Reservation: None

Member of Legislative Assembly
- 12th Manipur Legislative Assembly
- Incumbent Thounaojam Shyamkumar
- Party: Bharatiya Janata Party
- Elected year: 2022

Andro is one of the 60 constituencies of the Manipur Legislative Assembly. It is one of the 32 constituencies forming the parliamentary constituency of Inner Manipur.

== Extent ==
Andro is the 7th of the 60 assembly constituencies of Manipur. It consists of 44 parts namely: 1 - Andro (A), 2 - Andro (B), 3 - Andro (C), 4 - Andro (D), 5 - Andro (E), 6 - Andro Ward No-7, 7 - Andro (G), 8 - Andro (H), 9 - Andro (I), 10 - Andro (J), 11 - Huikap (A), 12 - Huikap (A-1), 13 - Huikap (B), 14 - Angtha (A), 15 - Angtha (B), 16 - Angtha (B-1), 17 - Poirou Khongjil (A), 18 - Poirou Khongjil (B), 19 - Poirou Khongjil (C), 20 - Tulihal (A), 21 - Tulihal (B), 22 - Tulihal Awang Leikai, 23 - Tulihal (D), 24 - Top Chingtha (A), 25 - Top Chingtha (A-1), 26 - Top Chingtha (B), 27 - Top Chingtha (C), 28 - Top Chingtha (C-1), 29 - Yambem (A), 30 - Yambem (A-1), 31 - Yambem, 32 - Yambem (C), 33 - Yambem (D), 34 - Changamdabi (A), 35 - Changamdabi (B), 36 - Changamdabi (C), 37 - Changamdabi (C-1), 38 - Changamdabi (D), 39 - Nungbrang, 40 - Keithelmanbi, 41 - Moirangpurel(A), 42 - Tumukhong, 43 - Moirangpurel(B), and 44 - Itham.

== Members of the Legislative Assembly ==
Year	Member	Party
1974	Ashraf Ali	Manipur Peoples Party
1980	Laitongbam Amujao	Indian National Congress
1984	Laitongbam Amujao	Indian National Congress
1990	Laitongbam Amujao	Indian National Congress
1995	Salam Chandra Singh	Manipur Peoples Party
2000	Salam Chandra Singh	Manipur Peoples Party
2002	Salam Chandra Singh	Federal Party of Manipur
2007	Thounaojam Shyamkumar	Manipur Peoples Party
2012	Thounaojam Shyamkumar	All India Trinamool Congress
2017	Thounaojam Shyamkumar	Indian National Congress
2022	Thounaojam Shyamkumar	Bharatiya Janata Party

== Election results ==
Vote share of winning candidates
2022	50.08%
2017	63.06%
2012	67.93%
2007	74.73%
2002	25.67%
2000	30.10%
1995	39.58%
1990	38.89%
1984	40.66%
1980	52.59%
1974	43.05%

=== 2027 Assembly election ===
2027 Manipur Legislative Assembly election: Andro
Party	Candidate	Votes	%	±%
INC				
NDA				
NOTA	None of the above			
Majority				
Turnout				
gain from		Swing		

=== 2022 Assembly election ===
2022 Manipur Legislative Assembly election: Andro
Party	Candidate	Votes	%	±%
BJP	Thounaojam Shyamkumar Singh	16,739	50.08%	14.18%
NPP	Lourembam Sanjoy Singh	15,282	45.72%	
Independent	Asheibam Bele Singh	894	2.67%	
INC	Keisham Ningthemjao Singh	388	1.16%	−61.90%
Margin of victory		1,457	4.36%	−22.80%
Turnout		33,423	93.02%	2.17%
Registered electors		35,930		8.63%
BJP gain from INC		Swing	-12.97%	

=== 2017 Assembly election ===
2017 Manipur Legislative Assembly election: Andro
Party	Candidate	Votes	%	±%
INC	Thounaojam Shyamkumar Singh	18,948	63.06%	36.84%
BJP	Dr. Nimaichand Luwang	10,787	35.90%	
Manipur National Democratic Front	Keisham Ningthemjao Singh	162	0.54%	
NOTA	None of the Above	152	0.51%	
Margin of victory		8,161	27.16%	−14.55%
Turnout		30,049	90.85%	2.45%
Registered electors		33,075		16.92%
INC gain from AITC		Swing	-4.87%	

=== 2012 Assembly election ===
2012 Manipur Legislative Assembly election: Andro
Party	Candidate	Votes	%	±%
AITC	Thounaojam Shyamkumar Singh	16,989	67.93%	
INC	Alhaj Md. Ahamed Ali	6,557	26.22%	5.26%
CPI	Yumkhaibam Dr. Mani Singh	903	3.61%	2.57%
NCP	Mongjam Jiten Singh	327	1.31%	0.65%
MSCP	Md Jalaluddin Shah	187	0.75%	
Margin of victory		10,432	41.71%	−12.06%
Turnout		25,009	88.39%	−2.31%
Registered electors		28,289		4.29%
AITC gain from MPP		Swing	-6.80%	

=== 2007 Assembly election ===
2007 Manipur Legislative Assembly election: Andro
Party	Candidate	Votes	%	±%
MPP	Thounaojam Shyamkumar Singh	18,388	74.73%	68.33%
INC	Salam Chandra Singh	5,157	20.96%	−0.48%
RJD	Keisham Ningthemjao Singh	581	2.36%	
CPI	Dr. Chingakham Angou	257	1.04%	
NCP	Md. Syed Ahmed	162	0.66%	
Margin of victory		13,231	53.77%	52.75%
Turnout		24,607	90.72%	−2.96%
Registered electors		27,125		18.29%
MPP gain from FPM		Swing	49.06%	

=== 2002 Assembly election ===
2002 Manipur Legislative Assembly election: Andro
Party	Candidate	Votes	%	±%
FPM	Salam Chandra Singh	5,402	25.67%	
SAP	Sahid Ahamad	5,188	24.65%	14.54%
INC	Thounaojam Shyamkumar Singh	4,513	21.44%	
MSCP	Loitongbam Amujou Singh	3,574	16.98%	−0.42%
MPP	Dr. Chingakham Angou Singh	1,347	6.40%	−23.70%
DRPP	Phanjoubam Chandra Singh	1,024	4.87%	
Margin of victory		214	1.02%	−11.68%
Turnout		21,048	93.68%	−0.15%
Registered electors		22,931		2.44%
FPM gain from MPP		Swing	-13.91%	

=== 2000 Assembly election ===
2000 Manipur Legislative Assembly election: Andro
Party	Candidate	Votes	%	±%
MPP	S. Chandra Singh	6,239	30.10%	−9.48%
MSCP	L. Amujao Singh	3,607	17.40%	
JD(U)	Md. Sahid Ahemed	3,190	15.39%	
BJP	Dr. Ch. Angou Singh	3,138	15.14%	
SAP	Dr. N. Binoykumar Singh	2,095	10.11%	4.71%
NCP	Th. Shyamkumar Singh	1,920	9.26%	
FPM	Md. Ajiruddin	539	2.60%	
Margin of victory		2,632	12.70%	0.83%
Turnout		20,728	93.72%	−0.12%
Registered electors		22,385		6.31%
MPP hold		Swing	-9.48%	

=== 1995 Assembly election ===
1995 Manipur Legislative Assembly election: Andro
Party	Candidate	Votes	%	±%
MPP	Salam Chandra Singh	7,678	39.58%	5.95%
Independent	Dr. Angou Singh Chingakham	5,376	27.71%	
INC	Loitongbam Amujao Singh	5,217	26.89%	−12.00%
SAP	Dr. Naorem Binoykumar Singh	1,047	5.40%	
Margin of victory		2,302	11.87%	6.60%
Turnout		19,400	93.84%	0.44%
Registered electors		21,056		−2.46%
MPP gain from INC		Swing	0.69%	

=== 1990 Assembly election ===
1990 Manipur Legislative Assembly election: Andro
Party	Candidate	Votes	%	±%
INC	L. Amujou	7,776	38.89%	−1.78%
MPP	Salam Chandra Singh	6,724	33.63%	7.22%
JD	Naoram Binoykumar Singh	5,496	27.49%	
Margin of victory		1,052	5.26%	−7.43%
Turnout		19,996	93.39%	0.50%
Registered electors		21,586		13.76%
INC hold		Swing	-1.78%	

=== 1984 Assembly election ===
1984 Manipur Legislative Assembly election: Andro
Party	Candidate	Votes	%	±%
INC	Loitongbam Amujou	7,005	40.66%	
JP	Asraf Ali	4,818	27.97%	
MPP	Salam Chandra Singh	4,549	26.41%	22.43%
IC(S)	Md. Ajeruddin	674	3.91%	
BJP	Konthoujamtopishak	181	1.05%	
Margin of victory		2,187	12.70%	3.55%
Turnout		17,227	92.89%	9.74%
Registered electors		18,975		12.84%
INC gain from INC(U)		Swing	-11.92%	

=== 1980 Assembly election ===
1980 Manipur Legislative Assembly election: Andro
Party	Candidate	Votes	%	±%
INC(U)	Loitongbam Amujou	6,905	52.59%	
JP	Ashraf Ali	5,704	43.44%	
MPP	Abdul Samad	522	3.98%	−39.08%
Margin of victory		1,201	9.15%	−4.61%
Turnout		13,131	83.15%	−6.66%
Registered electors		16,816		23.87%
INC(U) gain from MPP		Swing	9.53%	

=== 1974 Assembly election ===
1974 Manipur Legislative Assembly election: Andro
Party	Candidate	Votes	%	±%
MPP	Ashraf Ali	5,085	43.05%	
INC	Kshetrimayum Kirti Singh	3,460	29.29%	
Socialist Labour Party (India)	Leishungbam Cheiteinyo Singh	3,266	27.65%	
Margin of victory		1,625	13.76%	
Turnout		11,811	89.80%	
Registered electors		13,575		
MPP win (new seat)				

== See also ==
- List of constituencies of the Manipur Legislative Assembly
- Imphal East district
