= Oinam Assembly constituency =

Legislative Assembly constituency in Manipur State, India

Coordinates: 24.69°N 93.81°E

Oinam
- Constituency No. 25 for the Manipur Legislative Assembly

Constituency details
- Country: India
- Region: Northeast India
- State: Manipur
- District: Bishnupur
- Lok Sabha constituency: Inner Manipur
- Established: 1972
- Total electors: 28,688
- Reservation: None

Member of Legislative Assembly
- 12th Manipur Legislative Assembly
- Incumbent Irengbam Nalini Devi
- Party: NPP
- Alliance: NDA
- Elected year: 2022

Oinam Legislative Assembly constituency is one of the 60 Legislative Assembly constituencies of Manipur state in India.

It is part of Bishnupur district.

== Extent ==
Oinam is the 25th among 60 constituencies of Manipur. It consists of 39 parts namely: 1 - Leimram (A) 2 - Leimram, (B), 3 - Leimram Waroiching, 4 - Leimram Mamang Leikai, 5 - Heinoubok, 6 - Irengbam Awang mamang, 7 - Irengbam Makha Mamang Mayai Leikai, 8 - Irengbam Makha Maning Leikai (A), 9 - Irengbam Makha Maning Leikai, 10 - Irengbam Awang Maning Leikai, 11 - Oinam (A-1), 12 - Oinam (A-2), 13 - Oinam (B), 14 - Oinam (C), 15 - Oinam (D), 16 - Oinam Mamang Makha, 17 - Oinam (E-1), 18 - Oinam (E-2), 19 - Yumnam Khunou, 20 - Keinou Awang Sorok Maning, 21 - Keinou (A), 22 - Keinou (B), 23 - Keinou (C), 24 - Naikhong Khunou, 25 - Ngakchroupokpi, 26 - Ngaikhong Maning Leikai, 27 - Ngaikhong Khullen Kha Leikai, 28 - Ngaikhong Khullen Mamang Leikai, 29 - Ngaikhong Khullen Awang Leikai, 30 - Ngaikhong Siphai Maning Leikai, 31 - Ngaikhong Siphai Mamang Leikai, 32 - Toubul (A-1), 33 - Toubul (A-2), 34 - Toubul (B), 35 - Toubul Makha Maning, 36 - Toubul Mamang Makha, 37 - Khoijuman Khullen (A), 38 - Khoijuman Khullen (B), and 39 - Khoijuman Khullen (B-2).

== Members of the Legislative Assembly ==
Year	Member	Party
1972	Yamnam Yaima Singh	Manipur Peoples Party
1974	Yamnam Yaima Singh	Manipur Peoples Party
1980	Yamnam Yaima Singh	Janata Party
1984	Keisham Bira Singh	Indian National Congress
1990	Keisham Bira Singh	Indian National Congress
1995	Dr. Yumnam Jiten Singh	Manipur Peoples Party
2000	Dr. Yumnam Jiten Singh	Manipur State Congress Party
2002	Laishram Radhakishore Singh	Nationalist Congress Party
2007	Irengbam Ibohalbi Singh	Manipur Peoples Party
2012	Irengbam Ibohalbi Singh	All India Trinamool Congress
2017	Laishram Radhakishore Singh	Bharatiya Janata Party
2022	Irengbam Nalini Devi	National People's Party

== Election results ==
Vote share of winning candidates
2022	40.57%
2017	49.07%
2012	30.66%
2007	32.59%
2002	36.98%
2000	48.51%
1995	39.26%
1990	38.02%
1984	54.39%
1980	34.23%
1974	50.57%
1972	56.15%

=== 2027 Assembly election ===
2027 Manipur Legislative Assembly election: Oinam
Party	Candidate	Votes	%	±%
INC				
NDA				
NOTA	None of the above			
Majority				
Turnout				
gain from		Swing		

=== Assembly Election 2022 ===
2022 Manipur Legislative Assembly election: Oinam
Party	Candidate	Votes	%	±%
NPP	Irengbam Nalini Devi	10,808	40.57%	
BJP	Laishram Radhakishore Singh	10,366	38.91%	−10.16%
INC	Thokchom Ithoibi Devi	3,289	12.35%	−33.28%
RPI(A)	Laitonjam Brojen Singh	970	3.64%	
JD(U)	Thingbaijam Swarankumar Singh	527	1.98%	
SS	Ashem Babu Singh	408	1.53%	
Independent	Ngangom Shivakumar Singh	145	0.54%	
Margin of victory		442	1.66%	−1.78%
Turnout		26,641	92.86%	0.05%
Registered electors		28,688		8.60%
NPP gain from BJP		Swing	-8.50%	

=== Assembly Election 2017 ===
2017 Manipur Legislative Assembly election: Oinam
Party	Candidate	Votes	%	±%
BJP	Laishram Radhakishore Singh	12,029	49.07%	
INC	Dr. Irengbam Ibohalbi Singh	11,186	45.63%	19.80%
NCP	Romio Khundrakpam	1,030	4.20%	−12.12%
Manipur National Democratic Front	Laitonjam Thoiba Singh	190	0.78%	
Margin of victory		843	3.44%	−0.70%
Turnout		24,516	92.81%	1.16%
Registered electors		26,415		4.93%
BJP gain from AITC		Swing	18.41%	

=== Assembly Election 2012 ===
2012 Manipur Legislative Assembly election: Oinam
Party	Candidate	Votes	%	±%
AITC	Irengbam Ibohalbi Singh	7,074	30.66%	
MSCP	L. Radhakishore Singh	6,118	26.52%	
INC	Dr. Yumnam Jitendra Singh	5,958	25.82%	−3.41%
NCP	Romio Khundrakpam	3,765	16.32%	−12.59%
Margin of victory		956	4.14%	0.79%
Turnout		23,073	91.03%	0.45%
Registered electors		25,174		0.53%
AITC gain from MPP		Swing	-1.93%	

=== Assembly Election 2007 ===
2007 Manipur Legislative Assembly election: Oinam
Party	Candidate	Votes	%	±%
MPP	Irengbam Ibohalbi Singh	7,443	32.59%	
INC	L. Radhakishore	6,677	29.23%	3.20%
NCP	Dr. Yumnam Jitendra Singh	6,603	28.91%	−8.07%
RJD	Mutum Angouba	2,051	8.98%	
Margin of victory		766	3.35%	0.33%
Turnout		22,840	91.21%	1.36%
Registered electors		25,042		14.86%
MPP gain from NCP		Swing	-4.40%	

=== Assembly Election 2002 ===
2002 Manipur Legislative Assembly election: Oinam
Party	Candidate	Votes	%	±%
NCP	Laishram Radhakishore Singh	7,182	36.98%	7.12%
MSCP	Dr. Yumnam Jiten Singh	6,595	33.96%	−14.55%
INC	Dr. Mutum Angouba Singh	5,055	26.03%	4.41%
CPI	Nameirakpam Meghachandra Singh	285	1.47%	
Manipur National Conference	Thokchom Surjaboro Singh	170	0.88%	
Margin of victory		587	3.02%	−15.62%
Turnout		19,419	89.85%	−4.42%
Registered electors		21,803		6.91%
NCP gain from MSCP		Swing	-2.27%	

=== Assembly Election 2000 ===
2000 Manipur Legislative Assembly election: Oinam
Party	Candidate	Votes	%	±%
MSCP	Dr. Yumnam Jiten Singh	8,752	48.51%	
NCP	Laishram Radhakishore Singh	5,388	29.87%	
INC	Keisham Apabi Devi	3,900	21.62%	−16.00%
Margin of victory		3,364	18.65%	17.01%
Turnout		18,040	89.39%	−4.88%
Registered electors		20,394		11.94%
MSCP gain from MPP		Swing	9.26%	

=== Assembly Election 1995 ===
1995 Manipur Legislative Assembly election: Oinam
Party	Candidate	Votes	%	±%
MPP	Yumnam Jiten	6,651	39.26%	8.17%
INC	Keisham Apabi Devi	6,373	37.61%	−0.41%
FPM	Oinam Tombi	2,416	14.26%	
Independent	Ngangom Tomba Singh	1,015	5.99%	
JD	Nilababu Oinam	384	2.27%	
BJP	Nongthombam Nimai	104	0.61%	
Margin of victory		278	1.64%	−5.29%
Turnout		16,943	94.27%	0.99%
Registered electors		18,218		5.25%
MPP gain from INC		Swing	1.24%	

=== Assembly Election 1990 ===
1990 Manipur Legislative Assembly election: Oinam
Party	Candidate	Votes	%	±%
INC	Keisham Bira Singh	6,047	38.02%	−16.37%
MPP	Yamnam Yaima Singh	4,944	31.08%	
INS(SCS)	Thoudam Ibohal Singh	3,302	20.76%	
JD	Ngangom Tomba Singh	1,612	10.14%	
Margin of victory		1,103	6.93%	−4.84%
Turnout		15,905	93.28%	−1.38%
Registered electors		17,309		16.99%
INC hold		Swing	-16.37%	

=== Assembly Election 1984 ===
1984 Manipur Legislative Assembly election: Oinam
Party	Candidate	Votes	%	±%
INC	Keisham Bira Singh	7,415	54.39%	
Independent	Yamnam Yaima Singh	5,809	42.61%	
BJP	Laishram Khedajit Singh	354	2.60%	
Margin of victory		1,606	11.78%	9.98%
Turnout		13,634	94.65%	5.12%
Registered electors		14,795		4.86%
INC gain from JP		Swing	20.15%	

=== Assembly Election 1980 ===
1980 Manipur Legislative Assembly election: Oinam
Party	Candidate	Votes	%	±%
JP	Yamnam Yaima Singh	4,220	34.23%	
INC(I)	Keisham Bira Singh	3,998	32.43%	
Independent	Thoudam Iboyaima Singh	2,191	17.77%	
CPI	Laitonjam Borajao	1,265	10.26%	
MPP	Lamasbam Achouba	282	2.29%	−48.28%
Independent	Naoshekpam Jugeshwer	274	2.22%	
Independent	Chanambam Biren	97	0.79%	
Margin of victory		222	1.80%	0.66%
Turnout		12,327	89.53%	−2.72%
Registered electors		14,109		27.11%
JP gain from MPP		Swing	-16.34%	

=== Assembly Election 1974 ===
1974 Manipur Legislative Assembly election: Oinam
Party	Candidate	Votes	%	±%
MPP	Yamnam Yaima Singh	5,103	50.57%	−5.58%
INC	Muthum Amutombi Singh	4,988	49.43%	5.58%
Margin of victory		115	1.14%	−11.16%
Turnout		10,091	92.25%	6.70%
Registered electors		11,100		13.69%
MPP hold		Swing	-5.58%	

=== Assembly Election 1972 ===
1972 Manipur Legislative Assembly election: Oinam
Party	Candidate	Votes	%	±%
MPP	Yamnam Yaima Singh	4,585	56.15%	
INC	Muthum Amutombi Singh	3,581	43.85%	
Margin of victory		1,004	12.29%	
Turnout		8,166	85.55%	
Registered electors		9,763		
MPP win (new seat)				

== See also ==
- List of constituencies of the Manipur Legislative Assembly
- Bishnupur district
