= N. Kayisii =

Indian politician (1966 or 1967 – 2025)

Member of the Manipur Legislative Assembly
- In office 2017–2025
- Preceded by: Francis Ngajokpa
- Constituency: Tadubi

Personal details
- Born: 1966 or 1967
- Died: 18 January 2025 (aged 58) Lamphelpat, Imphal, Manipur, India
- Party: National People's Party
- Profession: Social worker

N. Kayisii (1966 or 1967 – 18 January 2025) was an Indian politician who was elected to the Manipur Legislative Assembly from the Tadubi constituency in the 2017 and 2022 Manipur Legislative Assembly elections as a member of the National People's Party. He was also the Manipur State Unit President of the NPP from March 2021. He was Minister of Tribal and Hill Areas Department and fisheries (2017–2020) in N. Biren Singh cabinet.

Kayisii died after a prolonged illness on 18 January 2025, at the age of 58.
