= Government of Manipur =

Indian State Government

Government of Manipur Manipur Leingāk
- Seat of Government: Imphal

Legislative branch
- Assembly: Manipur Legislative Assembly
- Speaker: Thokchom Satyabrata Singh
- Deputy Speaker: Kongkham Robindro Singh
- Members in Assembly: 60

Executive branch
- Governor: Ajay Kumar Bhalla
- Chief Minister: Yumnam Khemchand Singh
- Deputy Chief Minister: Nemcha Kipgen; Losii Dikho

Judiciary
- High Court: Manipur High Court
- Chief Justice: Justice K. Somashekar

The Government of Manipur (Meitei: Manipur Leingak; /mə.ni.pur lə́i.ŋak/), also known as the State Government of Manipur, or locally as State Government, is the supreme governing authority of the Indian state of Manipur and its 16 districts. It consists of an executive, led by the Governor of Manipur, a judiciary and a legislative branch (Manipur Legislative Assembly).

Like other states in India, the head of state of Manipur is the Governor, appointed by the President of India on the advice of the Central government. The post of governor is largely ceremonial. The Chief Minister is the head of government and is vested with most of the executive powers. Imphal is the capital of Manipur, and houses the Vidhan Sabha (Legislative Assembly) and the secretariat. The high court of manipur exercises the jurisdiction and powers in respect of cases arising in the State.

== Council of Ministers ==
Cabinet members
Portfolio	Minister	Took office	Left office	Party
Chief Minister; All departments not assigned to any other minister	Yumnam Khemchand Singh	4 February 2026	Incumbent	BJP
Deputy Chief Minister	Nemcha Kipgen	4 February 2026	Incumbent	BJP
Deputy Chief Minister	Losii Dikho	4 February 2026	Incumbent	NPF
Minister for Home Affairs	Govindas Konthoujam	4 February 2026	Incumbent	BJP
Minister	Khuraijam Loken Singh	4 February 2026	Incumbent	NPP

== See also ==
- Yumnam Khemchand Singh ministry
