= Lourembam Rameshwor Meetei =

Indian politician

Member of the Manipur Legislative Assembly

Lourembam Rameshwor Meetei (born 1980) is an Indian politician from Manipur. He is a member of the Manipur Legislative Assembly from Keirao Assembly constituency in Imphal East district. He won the 2022 Manipur Legislative Assembly election representing the Bharatiya Janata Party.

== Early life and education ==
Meetei is from Kyamgei, Imphal East district, Manipur. He is the son of Lourembam Iboton Singh. He completed his BA in 2014 at Regional College, Lilong, which is affiliated to Manipur University.

== Career ==
Meetei won from Keirao Assembly constituency representing the Bharatiya Janata Party in the 2022 Manipur Legislative Assembly election. He polled 17,335 votes and defeated his nearest rival, Md. Nasiruddin Khan of the National People's Party, by a margin of 8,209 votes. He was first elected in the 2017 Manipur Legislative Assembly election, also from the Keirao constituency.
