= Thounaojam Shyamkumar Singh =

Indian politician

Member of the Manipur Legislative Assembly
- Incumbent
- Assumed office 2022
- Preceded by: Salam Chandra Singh
- Constituency: Andro

Minister of forest, horticulture, soil conservation and the department of municipal administration, housing & urban development Government of Manipur
- In office 2007–2020
- Constituency: Andro
- In office 2017–2020

Personal details
- Party: Bharatiya Janata Party (2020-present)
- Other political affiliations: Nationalist Congress Party; Indian National Congress (2002-2007,2017-2020 ) Manipur People's Party (2002-2007); All India Trinamool Congress (2012-2017)

Thounaojam Shyamkumar Singh is a politician from Manipur, India. He was minister of forest, horticulture, soil conservation and the department of municipal administration, housing & urban development (2017-2020) in the Biren Singh-led coalition government.

== Career ==
In 2002, he contested the Manipur Legislative Assembly election as the Indian National Congress candidate in the Andro constituency, finishing third with 4,513 votes.

In 2007 he was elected to the Legislative Assembly as the Manipur People's Party candidate in the Andro constituency. Notably, he contested the elections whilst being in jail. He had been arrested in October 2006 at Indira Gandhi International Airport, Delhi, and was accused of being a member of Kanglei Yawol Kanna Lup and working as a liaison between KYKL and the United National Liberation Front.

In August 2007, he was elected Deputy Speaker of the Manipur Legislative Assembly.

In January 2017, Khoirom Ranjeet, the leader of the banned Kangleipak Communist Party, Poirei Meiti who had been recently arrested for an extortion and kidnapping ring, was revealed to have links to Shayamkumar. One of the MLA's aides was said to have run the ring on behalf of Ranjeet, who is suspected of being involved in 11 different attacks on restaurants and hospitals in Manipur.

In 2017, he joined Bharatiya Janata Party and was made Minister of forest, horticulture, soil conservation and the department of municipal administration, housing & urban development in the Biren Singh-led coalition government.

In March 2020, Shyamkumar was disqualified as a legislator from the Manipur Legislative Assembly on the grounds of defection under the 10th schedule of the Constitution. A disqualification case against Shyamkumar was registered by 15 Indian National Congress MLAs, including T. N. Haokip, Md Fazur Rahim and K. Meghachandra. Shyamkumar had been elected on an Indian National Congress ticket but had switched his allegiance to the Bharatiya Janata Party soon after.

He was re-elected in 2022 as a BJP candidate from Andro.
