= Konthoujam Assembly constituency =

Legislative Assembly constituency in Manipur State, India

Coordinates: 24.74°N 93.85°E

Konthoujam
- Constituency No. 18 for the Manipur Legislative Assembly

Constituency details
- Country: India
- Region: Northeast India
- State: Manipur
- District: Imphal West
- Lok Sabha constituency: Inner Manipur
- Established: 1967
- Total electors: 30,018
- Reservation: None

Member of Legislative Assembly
- 12th Manipur Legislative Assembly
- Incumbent Sapam Ranjan Singh
- Party: Bharatiya Janata Party

Konthoujam Legislative Assembly constituency is one of the 60 Legislative Assembly constituencies of Manipur state in India.

It is part of Imphal West district.

== Extent ==
Konthoujam is the 18th among 60 constituencies of Manipur. It consists of 41 parts namely: 1 - Moidangpok Khullen (A), 2 - Moidangpok Khullen (B), 3 - Moidangpok Khullen (C), 4 - Moidangpok Khunou, 5 - Moidangpok Khunou (Keithelmanbi), 6 - Khumbong, 7 - Khumbong Maning Leikai, 8 - Ngairangbam Awang, 9 - Ngairangbam Makha, 10 - Sagoltongba Makha, 11 - Sagoltongba Sabal Leikai, 12 - Sagoltongba Awang, 13 - Yurembam Mamang, 14 - Yurembam Makha, 15 - Yurembam Awang Leikai (A), 16 - Yurembam Awang Leikai (B), 17 - Konthoujam Mamang Leikai (A), 18 - Konthoujam Mamang Leikai (B), 19 - Konthoujam Maning Leikai (A), 20 - Konthoujam Maning Leikai (B), 21 - Khaidem Awang, 22 - Khaidem Makha, 23 - Khabi (A), 24 - Khabi (B), 25 - Bamdiar Awang, 26 - Bamdiar Makha, 27 - Heikrujam Maning, 28 - Heikrujam Mamang, 29 - Kamong (A), 30 - Kamong (B), 31 - Kamong Meisnam, 32 - Kha Jiri Part -1, 33 - Kha Jiri Part-2, 34 - Awang Jiri Mamang, 35 - Awang Jiri Maning, 36 - Phoijing (A), 37 - Phoijing (B), 38 - Bamdiar, 39 - Phoijing (C), 40 - Kamong Langoljam Mamang, and 41 - Kamong Langoljam Maning.

== Members of the Legislative Assembly ==
Year	Winner	Party
1967	S. Tombi	Indian National Congress
1972	Khangembam Lakshman	Manipur Peoples Party
1974	Heigrujam Thoithoi	Independent politician
1980	Henam Lokhon Singh	Indian National Congress
1984	Henam Lokhon Singh	Indian National Congress
1990	Heigrujam Thoithoi	Manipur Peoples Party
1995	Henam Lokhon Singh	Indian National Congress
2000	Henam Lokhon Singh	Manipur State Congress Party
2002	Dr. Thokchom Meinya	Democratic Revolutionary Peoples Party
2007	Dr. Sapam Budhichandra Singh	Indian National Congress
2012	Konthoujam Sharat Singh	All India Trinamool Congress
2017	Dr. Sapam Ranjan Singh	Bharatiya Janata Party
2022	Dr. Sapam Ranjan Singh	Bharatiya Janata Party

== Election results ==
Vote share of winning candidates
2022	47.29%
2017	54.99%
2012	45.87%
2007	23.88%
2002	25.32%
2000	34.98%
1995	34.82%
1990	49.74%
1984	23.84%
1980	21.63%
1974	27.02%
1972	39.20%
1967	39.28%

=== 2027 Assembly election ===
2027 Manipur Legislative Assembly election: Konthoujam
Party	Candidate	Votes	%	±%
INC				
NDA				
NOTA	None of the above			
Majority				
Turnout				
gain from		Swing		

=== 2022 Assembly election ===
2022 Manipur Legislative Assembly election: Konthoujam
Party	Candidate	Votes	%	±%
BJP	Dr. Sapam Ranjan Singh	13,432	47.29%	−7.70%
NPP	Konthoujam Sharat Singh	13,038	45.90%	
INC	Laishram Nando Singh	895	3.15%	−41.19%
JD(U)	Nongmaithem Herojit Singh	811	2.86%	
NOTA	Nota	152	0.54%	
Margin of victory		394	1.39%	−9.26%
Turnout		28,403	94.62%	1.47%
Registered electors		30,018		7.43%
BJP hold		Swing	-7.70%	

=== 2017 Assembly election ===
2017 Manipur Legislative Assembly election: Konthoujam
Party	Candidate	Votes	%	±%
BJP	Dr. Sapam Ranjan Singh	14,313	54.99%	
INC	Konthoujam Sharat Singh	11,541	44.34%	0.65%
Margin of victory		2,772	10.65%	8.47%
Turnout		26,029	93.15%	3.39%
Registered electors		27,943		6.45%
BJP gain from AITC		Swing	9.12%	

=== 2012 Assembly election ===
2012 Manipur Legislative Assembly election: Konthoujam
Party	Candidate	Votes	%	±%
AITC	Konthoujam Sharat Singh	10,807	45.87%	
INC	Dr. Sapam Ranjan Singh	10,293	43.69%	19.81%
MPP	Nongmaithem Herojit	1,637	6.95%	−7.66%
CPI	Maisnam Shakhi Leima	823	3.49%	−8.40%
Margin of victory		514	2.18%	1.82%
Turnout		23,560	89.76%	−1.64%
Registered electors		26,249		4.65%
AITC gain from INC		Swing	21.99%	

=== 2007 Assembly election ===
2007 Manipur Legislative Assembly election: Konthoujam
Party	Candidate	Votes	%	±%
INC	Dr. Sapam Budhichandra Singh	5,475	23.88%	4.09%
NPP	Konthoujam Sharat Singh	5,391	23.51%	
NCP	Nongmaithem Kuber	3,856	16.82%	15.22%
MPP	Shamom Nabakumar Meitei	3,350	14.61%	2.33%
CPI	Dr. Laishram Shashikumar Singh	2,727	11.89%	−2.47%
RJD	Henam Lokhon Singh	1,872	8.17%	
SP	Konthoujam Ranbir Singh	188	0.82%	
Margin of victory		84	0.37%	−4.20%
Turnout		22,926	91.40%	−0.79%
Registered electors		25,083		12.35%
INC gain from DRPP		Swing	-1.44%	

=== 2002 Assembly election ===
2002 Manipur Legislative Assembly election: Konthoujam
Party	Candidate	Votes	%	±%
DRPP	Dr. Thokchom Meinya	5,152	25.32%	
MSCP	Henam Lokhon Singh	4,223	20.75%	−14.23%
INC	Sapam Budhichandra Singh	4,027	19.79%	−2.29%
CPI	Okram Ibotombi	2,923	14.36%	−9.95%
MPP	Konthoujam Ranbir Singh	2,499	12.28%	−6.17%
FPM	Mahendra Nongmaithem	1,139	5.60%	
NCP	Heigrujam Thoithoi	326	1.60%	
Margin of victory		929	4.57%	−6.10%
Turnout		20,349	92.19%	−1.55%
Registered electors		22,326		5.00%
DRPP gain from MSCP		Swing	-9.50%	

=== 2000 Assembly election ===
2000 Manipur Legislative Assembly election: Konthoujam
Party	Candidate	Votes	%	±%
MSCP	Henam Lokhon Singh	6,903	34.98%	
CPI	Nongmaithem Joykumar	4,798	24.31%	−3.90%
INC	Dr. Sapam Budhichandra Singh	4,357	22.08%	−12.74%
MPP	Heigrujam Thoithoi	3,641	18.45%	−16.08%
Margin of victory		2,105	10.67%	10.38%
Turnout		19,735	93.64%	−0.10%
Registered electors		21,262		8.39%
MSCP gain from INC		Swing	0.16%	

=== 1995 Assembly election ===
1995 Manipur Legislative Assembly election: Konthoujam
Party	Candidate	Votes	%	±%
INC	Henam Lokhon Singh	6,313	34.82%	−3.17%
MPP	Heigrujam Thoithoi	6,261	34.53%	−15.21%
CPI	Okram Ibotombi	5,116	28.22%	15.94%
BJP	Yurembam Sarat	343	1.89%	
JD	Ningthoujam Manishang Devi	98	0.54%	
Margin of victory		52	0.29%	−11.46%
Turnout		18,131	93.74%	−3.96%
Registered electors		19,616		7.52%
INC gain from MPP		Swing	-14.92%	

=== 1990 Assembly election ===
1990 Manipur Legislative Assembly election: Konthoujam
Party	Candidate	Votes	%	±%
MPP	Heigrujam Thoithoi	8,817	49.74%	
INC	Henam Lokhon Singh	6,734	37.99%	14.15%
CPI	Irom Chaoba Singh	2,176	12.28%	−6.32%
Margin of victory		2,083	11.75%	10.51%
Turnout		17,727	97.70%	6.28%
Registered electors		18,244		12.14%
MPP gain from INC		Swing	25.90%	

=== 1984 Assembly election ===
1984 Manipur Legislative Assembly election: Konthoujam
Party	Candidate	Votes	%	±%
INC	Henam Lokhon Singh	3,449	23.84%	
Independent	Heigrujam Thoithoi	3,270	22.60%	
CPI	Irom Chaoba Singh	2,691	18.60%	−1.99%
Independent	Nongmaithem Birendrajit Singh	2,028	14.02%	
Independent	M. Tomchou Singh	1,813	12.53%	
Independent	Thongam Shama Singh	1,219	8.42%	
Margin of victory		179	1.24%	0.20%
Turnout		14,470	91.43%	3.74%
Registered electors		16,269		11.78%
INC gain from INC(I)		Swing	2.21%	

=== 1980 Assembly election ===
1980 Manipur Legislative Assembly election: Konthoujam
Party	Candidate	Votes	%	±%
INC(I)	Henam Lokhon Singh	2,711	21.63%	
CPI	Thangjam Babu	2,581	20.59%	−0.07%
JP	Heigrujam Thoithoi	2,529	20.18%	
Independent	Nongmaithem Birendrajit Singh	2,268	18.09%	
Independent	Nongmaithem Tomchou	1,231	9.82%	
MPP	Loktongbam Chaoba Singh	756	6.03%	−15.50%
JP(S)	Hijam Nimai	252	2.01%	
INC(U)	Konthoujamibocha	206	1.64%	
Margin of victory		130	1.04%	−4.46%
Turnout		12,534	87.69%	−1.35%
Registered electors		14,554		19.67%
INC(I) gain from Independent		Swing	-5.39%	

=== 1974 Assembly election ===
1974 Manipur Legislative Assembly election: Konthoujam
Party	Candidate	Votes	%	±%
Independent	Heigrujam Thoithoi	2,878	27.02%	
MPP	Khangembam Lakshman	2,293	21.53%	−17.66%
CPI	Irom Chaoba Singh	2,200	20.66%	−13.01%
Independent	Kayenpaibam Manihar	1,377	12.93%	
Independent	Loktongbam Chaoba Singh	1,053	9.89%	
CPI(M)	Meitram Shamu Singh	849	7.97%	
Margin of victory		585	5.49%	−0.04%
Turnout		10,650	89.04%	5.88%
Registered electors		12,162		31.71%
Independent gain from MPP		Swing	-12.17%	

=== 1972 Assembly election ===
1972 Manipur Legislative Assembly election: Konthoujam
Party	Candidate	Votes	%	±%
MPP	Khangembam Lakshman	2,942	39.20%	
CPI	Thangjam Babu	2,527	33.67%	12.44%
INC	R. K. Udaysana	2,193	34.09%	−5.19%
INC	Rajkumar Birachandra	2,037	27.14%	−12.14%
Independent	Nongthombam Chaoba Singh	1,912	29.72%	
MPP	Aribam Bimola Devi	1,301	20.22%	
Independent	Wahengbam Nabachandra	800	12.44%	
Socialist Labour Party (India)	Sanglakpam Nityai Sharma	227	3.53%	
Margin of victory		415	5.53%	3.57%
Turnout		7,506	83.16%	2.00%
Registered electors		9,234		−36.91%
MPP gain from INC		Swing	-0.08%	

=== 1967 Assembly election ===
1967 Manipur Legislative Assembly election: Konthoujam
Party	Candidate	Votes	%	±%
INC	S. Tombi	4,522	39.28%	
Independent	A. Kullachandra	4,297	37.32%	
CPI	T. Babu	2,444	21.23%	
Independent	H. Kondo	162	1.41%	
Independent	Y. Tomba	88	0.76%	
Margin of victory		225	1.95%	
Turnout		11,513	81.16%	
Registered electors		14,636		
INC win (new seat)				

== See also ==
- List of constituencies of the Manipur Legislative Assembly
- Imphal West district
