= Sapam Budhichandra Singh =

Indian politician

Dr. Sapam Budhichandra Singh

23rd Speaker of the Manipur Legislative Assembly
- In office 16 March 2007
- Preceded by: Dr.Maniruddin Shaikh

Personal details
- Born: 1 March 1949 (age 77) Konthoujam, Manipur, India
- Party: Indian National Congress
- Spouse: Dr.Kh.Tamubi Devi
- Children: 2 Sons and 1 Daughter
- Education: Institute of Medical Sciences, Banaras Hindu University
- Occupation: Politician

Dr. Sapam Budhichandra Singh (born 1 March 1949) is an Indian politician from Manipur and a Member of Manipur Legislative Assembly, representing Konthoujam Assembly Constituency since 2004. He was elected unopposed as the Speaker of Ninth Manipur Legislative Assembly on 16 March 2007. He is a member of the Indian National Congress.

== Early life ==
Dr. Sapam Budhichandra Singh was born in Konthoujam Awang Leikai in Imphal West District of Manipur, to Sapam Mani Singh and the late Sapam Ongbi Konthoujam Angoubi Devi.

He attended Konthoujam LP School, Awang Khunou ME School, Johnstone Higher Secondary School and D.M College and later joined Assam Medical College for his MBBS Degree, M.D in Radio Diagnosis from Banaras Hindu University, U.P and Freiberg University, Germany.

As a doctor by profession, he had served in various parts of Manipur . He was the head of Department of Radio diagnosis in Jawaharlal Nehru Hospital before he took voluntary retirement in the year 1999, after 27 years of government service.

== Political career ==
Dr. Sapam Budhichandra Singh had served as a General Secretary of Manipur Pradesh Congress Committee (I) from the year 2000. He served as a Member, Election Committee of Manipur Pradesh Congress Committee(I) from 2001 to 2004.

As a Speaker of Manipur Legislative Assembly, he attended 53rd, 54th, and 55th Commonwealth Parliamentary Association Conference held in New Delhi (India), Kuala Lumpur (Malaysia) and Arusha (Tanzania) in the year 2007, 2008 and 2009.

== Personal life ==
Dr. Sapam Budhichandra Singh married Dr. Khwairakpam Tamubi Devi (Daughter of Late Khwairakpam Chaoba, who represented Sekmai Assembly Constituency, from the late 1940s to early 1980s). He has three children, two sons and a daughter.
