= Sanasam Premachandra Singh =

Indian politician

Member of the Manipur Legislative Assembly

Sanasam Premachandra Singh (born 1976) is an Indian politician from Manipur. He is a member of the Manipur Legislative Assembly from Kumbi Assembly constituency in Bishnupur district. He won the 2022 Manipur Legislative Assembly election, representing the Bharatiya Janata Party.

== Early life and education ==
Singh is from Moirang post, Kumbi police station, Bishnupur, Manipur. He is the son of late Sanasam Jaramaja Singh. He married Ibeyaima Devi, and they have three sons, Sanasam Priyojit Singh, Sanasam Priyokanta Singh and Sanasam Priyobarta Singh. He completed his Class 12 in 2019 at P. L. C. Academy, Yairipok, and passed the examinations conducted by Uttar Purva Siksha Board, Assam.

== Career ==
Singh won from Kumbi Assembly constituency representing the Bharatiya Janata Party in the 2022 Manipur Legislative Assembly election. He polled 8,513 votes and defeated his nearest competitor, Ahanthem Shanjoy Singh of the Janata Dal (United), by 372 votes.
