= Losii Dikho =

Indian politician (born 1966)

Deputy Chief Minister of Manipur
- Incumbent
- Assumed office 4 February 2026 Serving with Nemcha Kipgen
- Chief Minister: Yumnam Khemchand Singh
- Preceded by: Yumnam Joykumar Singh (2020)

Member of Manipur Legislative Assembly
- Incumbent
- Assumed office 2012
- Preceded by: M. Thohrii
- Constituency: Mao

Personal details
- Born: 1 March 1966 (age 60) Punanamei, Mao
- Party: Naga People's Front
- Spouse: PF Martha
- Children: 6
- Education: Bachelor of Arts, Dimapur Arts College
- Occupation: Social worker

Losii Dikho (born 1 March 1966) is an Indian politician serving as Deputy Chief Minister of Manipur alongside Nemcha Kipgen since 2026. He was elected to the Manipur Legislative Assembly from Mao in the 2012, 2017, and 2022 Manipur Legislative Assembly election, as a member of the Naga People's Front. Dikho is the Legislature Party Leader of Naga People's Front in Manipur Legislative Assembly . He was Minister of PHED, printing and stationery (2017–2022) in N. Biren Singh cabinet. On February 4, 2026, Losii Dikho was appointed as Deputy chief ministers of Manipur. He was given the portfolios of Public Health Engineering (PHED), Forest, Environment & Climate Change in Y. Khemchand Singh ministry
