= Kongkham Robindro Singh =

Indian politician

Deputy Speaker of the Manipur Legislative Assembly
- Incumbent
- Assumed office 8 February 2018
- Chief Minister: Biren Singh; Y Khemchand Singh
- Speaker: Thokchom Satyabrata Singh

Member of the Manipur Legislative Assembly
- Incumbent
- Assumed office 2017
- Constituency: Mayang Imphal

Personal details
- Party: Bharatiya Janata Party

Kongkham Robindro Singh is a Bharatiya Janata Party politician from Manipur. He has been elected to the Manipur Legislative Assembly in the 2017 elections from Mayang Imphal constituency as a BJP candidate. He is current deputy speaker of Manipur Legislative Assembly.
