= Nemcha Kipgen =

Indian politician (born 1965)

Deputy Chief Minister of Manipur
- Incumbent
- Assumed office 4 February 2026 Serving with Losii Dikho
- Chief Minister: Y. Khemchand Singh
- Ministry and Departments: Rural Development & Panchayati Raj, Tribal Affairs & Hills
- Preceded by: Yumnam Joykumar Singh (2020)

Member of Manipur Legislative Assembly
- Incumbent
- Assumed office 2012
- Preceded by: Thangminlen Kipgen
- Constituency: Kangpokpi

Minister of Social Welfare and Cooperation of Manipur
- In office 19 March 2017 – 24 September 2020
- Chief Minister: N. Biren Singh

Minister of Commerce & Industry and Textiles & Cooperation of Manipur
- In office 20 March 2022 – 13 February 2025
- Chief Minister: N. Biren Singh

Personal details
- Born: 1 November 1965 (age 60) Haipi, Manipur, India
- Party: Bharatiya Janata Party (since 2017)
- Other political affiliations: Indian National Congress; MSCP
- Spouse: S. T. Thangboi Kipgen
- Children: 2
- Occupation: Politician; social worker

Nemcha Kipgen (born 1 November 1965) is an Indian politician and member of the Bharatiya Janata Party serving as Deputy Chief Minister of Manipur alongside Losii Dikho since 2026. Kipgen has been a member of the Manipur Legislative Assembly from the Kangpokpi constituency since 2017. She was the Minister for Social Welfare and Cooperation during 2017–2020 in First Biren Singh ministry. She was the Cabinet Minister for Textile, Commerce and Industry in Second Biren Singh ministry. On February 4, 2026 Nemcha Kipgen as Deputy Chief Minister of Manipur along with Losii Dikho the Legislative Party Leader of Naga People's Front who was also appointed as Deputy Chief Minister of Manipur. She is also the minister of Rural Development & Panchayati Raj, Tribal Affairs & Hills.

== Family ==
Nemcha Kipgen is a niece of four-time legislator Thangminlen Kipgen. She is married to S.T. Thangboi Kipgen, the chairman of the Kuki National Front (President), a militant group that has been under a Suspension of Operations agreement with the Government of India since 2008.

== Political career ==
=== 2012–2017 ===
Nemcha Kipgen contested and won the legislative assembly seat from the Kangpokpi constituency in 2012, on a ticket of Manipur State Congress Party (MSCP). She came up from the ranks of the Sadar Hills District Demand movement of the Kuki people, which was mainly organised by the women activists of the area. MSCP, originally an off-shoot of Indian National Congress, merged back into Congress in 2014 along with its 5 legislators. Bharatiya Janata Party (BJP) called for the disqualification of the legislators, but did not succeed.

During the 2015 protests against the controversial "anti-tribal bills" passed by the state legislature, Nemcha Kipgen's house was set ablaze by protesters along with several other legislators and ministers. In 2016, Kipgen was appointed as the chairperson of the state legislature's Committee on Welfare of Women and Children.

=== 2017–2023 ===
In January 2017, a few months before the next Assembly election, Kipgen resigned from Congress and joined the BJP. She retained her Kangpokpi seat in the 2017 election, beating her nearest rival by close to 2,300 votes. She seconded the nomination of N. Biren Singh for the leader of the BJP legislative party, leading his elevation to the Chief Minister. Kipgen was chosen as the Minister for Social Welfare and Cooperation in Biren Singh ministry. She served in this post till 2020, when she was dropped during a Cabinet reshuffle. The women supporters of Kipgen in Kangpokpi protested the action, and burnt an effigy of Biren Singh.

In the 2022 Assembly election, Nemcha Kipgen again won the seat from Kangpokpi, beating her nearest rival by close to 5,400 votes. She was sworn in as a Cabinet minister along with Chief Minister Biren Singh, and allocated the portfolios Commerce and Industry, Textiles and Cooperation in the ministry.

=== 2023–2025 Manipur violence ===
After the ethnic violence between Meitei and Kuki-Zo communities erupted in 2023, Nemcha Kipgen's official residence was burnt down in Imphal. Kipgen moved to Kangpokpi and worked from her home till the end of the Biren Singh ministry in February 2025. In May 2023, Kipgen, along with other Kuki-Zo MLAs of Manipur, demanded "separate administration" for the Kuki-Zo inhabited areas because the Imphal Valley was "as good as death" for their people. In August 2023, she was a signatory to a memorandum to the Prime Minister demanding the appointment of a separate Chief Secretary and a Director General of Police (DGP) for the Kuki-inhabited areas. She was nominated to the peace panel in June 2023, but the panel never got off the ground. In December 2024, Kipgen, along with other MLAs from the Kangpokpi district, condemned the violence perpetrated by the Meitei militias on the fringe areas of the Kangpokpi district.

On 4 February 2026, Kipgen was appinted as the Deputy Chief minister of Manipur under Chief Minister Yumnam Khemchand Singh. She was given the portfolios of Rural Development & Panchayati Raj, Tribal Affairs & Hills.
