= Democratic Revolutionary Peoples Party =

Minor Indian policital party

- Abbreviation: DRPP
- Merged into: Indian National Congress

Election symbol
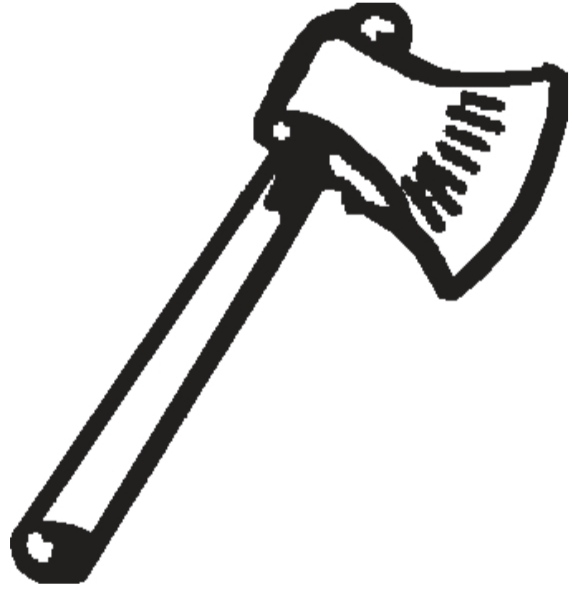

The Democratic Revolutionary Peoples Party (DRPP) was a political party in the Indian state of Manipur. The party launched 23 candidates in the state assembly elections in 2002, out of whom two were elected - N. Biren Singh and Thokchom Meinya.

In total, the party received 51,916 votes. Post-elections, the party joined the Manipur Progressive Secular Alliance led by the Indian National Congress (INC) in Manipur. Ahead of the 2004 Lok Sabha elections, the DRPP merged with the INC.
