= Yumnam Khemchand Singh =

Indian politician (born 1963)

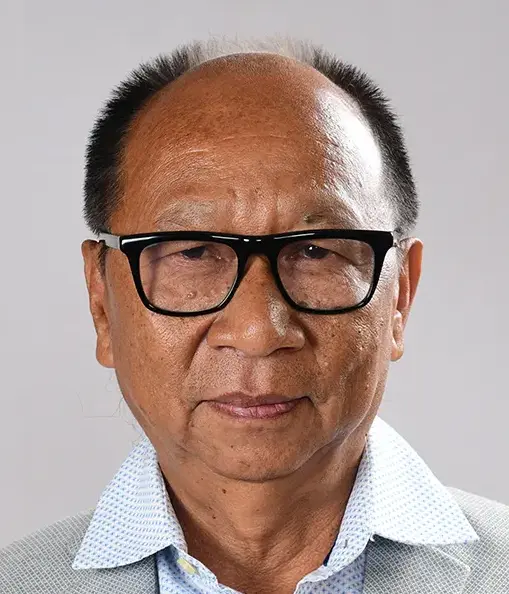
- Singh in 2026

13th Chief Minister of Manipur
- Incumbent
- Assumed office 4 February 2026
- Governor: Ajay Kumar Bhalla
- Deputy: Losii Dikho; Nemcha Kipgen
- Cabinet: Y Khemchand Singh
- Preceded by: President's rule (Note: N. Biren Singh was Chief Minister before President's rule, which was imposed due to his resignation.)

Minister of Municipal Administration Housing Development, Rural Development, Panchayati Raj, and Education of Manipur
- In office 20 March 2022 – 13 February 2025
- Chief Minister: N. Biren Singh

Speaker of the Manipur Legislative Assembly
- In office 19 March 2017 – 20 March 2022
- Succeeded by: Thokchom Satyabrata Singh

Member of Manipur Legislative Assembly
- Incumbent
- Assumed office 19 March 2017
- Preceded by: Irengbam Hemochandra Singh
- Constituency: Singjamei

Personal details
- Born: 1 March 1963 (age 63) Manipur, India
- Party: Bharatiya Janata Party

Yumnam Khemchand Singh (born 1 March 1963) is an Indian politician who is currently serving as the Chief Minister of Manipur since 4 February 2026. A member of the Bharatiya Janata Party, he has represented the Singjamei constituency in the Manipur Legislative Assembly since 2017. He served as a cabinet minister in the second Biren Singh ministry from March 2022 to February 2025, and was the speaker of the Manipur assembly from 2017 to 2022.

== Political career ==
=== Speaker of Legislative Assembly ===
In the 2017 Manipur Legislative Assembly election, the Bharatiya Janata Party (BJP) won 21 seats in the 60-member assembly, and Khemchand won from the Singjamei constituency. Though BJP was not the largest party and did not have an absolute majority, it formed the government with the support of National People's Party, Naga People's Front, and other smaller parties. Khemchand was elected as the speaker of the assembly. When eight legislators from the opposition Indian National Congress supported the BJP-led government, speaker Khemchand did not take a decision on the disqualification cases against them as per the anti-defection law. One of them, Thounaojam Shyamkumar Singh, was later disqualified in March 2020 following an order of the Supreme Court of India. While four of the remaining seven returned to the Congress, three remained with the ruling BJP. On the eve of the election for the lone Rajya Sabha seat from Manipur, the Manipur High Court restrained the seven legislators from entering the assembly until the speaker took a decision on their status. Khemchand then decided to disqualify the four members that returned to Congress fold, and allowed the three legislators that stayed with the BJP into the assembly, and the election was won by the BJP candidate Leishemba Sanajaoba.

=== Cabinet Minister ===
After the 2022 Manipur Legislative Assembly election, the BJP won 32 seats and achieved a majority. Though Khemchand was one of the candidates for the chief minister's post, N. Biren Singh became the chief minister. Khemchand was sworn in as a cabinet minister in the second Biren Singh ministry and was given three ministries as his portfolio: Municipal Administration and Housing Development, Rural Development and Panchayati Raj, and Education.

After the onset of the 2023–2025 Manipur violence in May 2023, the union government summoned Manipur's cabinet ministers including Khemchand to Delhi. People from the Singjamei constituency submitted a memorandum with demands to Khemchand. In October, some unidentified miscreants lobbed a grenade at the gate of his residence, injuring a Central Reserve Police Force personnel and a relative of Khemchand. In June 2024, the women's wing of the Coordinating Committee on Manipur Integrity stormed his house asking him to make his stand clear on the prevailing situation of the state, and Khemchand reportedly asked for dialogue between the warring groups.

On 13 February 2025, Khemchand ceased to be the speaker after the Manipur assembly was suspended and the state was placed under the President's rule. In December 2025, Khemchand visited Kuki villages in Ukhrul and Kamjong, in the first such outreach effort by a Meitei politician since the violence erupted between the two ethnic groups on 3 May 2023.

=== Chief minister ===
Khemchand took charge as the Chief Minister of Manipur on 4 February 2026, after the President's rule was revoked earlier.

== Other achievements ==
Khemchand is a master in Taekwondo, which he started learning at the age of 16. He is recognised for promoting Taekwondo as a competitive sport nationwide, and is widely acknowledged for his contributions in establishing the Taekwondo Federation of India, of which he later rose to vice president, and also founding the All Assam Taekwondo Association in 1982.

In December 2025 he became the first Indian to be awarded the 5th Dan in traditional Taekwondo by Global Traditional Taekwondo Federation (GTTF) in Seoul, South Korea.
