= Thokchom Satyabrata Singh =

Indian politician

Speaker of Manipur Legislative Assembly
- Incumbent
- Assumed office 24 March 2022
- Leader: Biren Singh; Y Khemchand Singh
- Preceded by: Yumnam Khemchand Singh

Minister of Consumer Affairs, Food & Public Distribution, Law & Legislative Affairs of Manipur, Labour & Employment Government of Manipur
- In office 2020–2022

Member of the Manipur Legislative Assembly
- Incumbent
- Assumed office 19 March 2017
- Preceded by: Elangbam Chand Singh
- Constituency: Yaiskul

Personal details
- Born: 1 March 1974 (age 52)
- Party: Bharatiya Janata Party
- Parent: Th. Birchand Singh (father)
- Education: Manipur University (M.Sc in Botany)

Thokchom Satyabrata Singh is a Bharatiya Janata Party politician from Manipur. He has been elected in Manipur Legislative Assembly election in 2017 and 2022 from Yaiskul constituency as a candidate of Bharatiya Janata Party. He is the current Speaker of Manipur Legislative Assembly.

He was the State Cabinet Minister for Consumer Affairs, Food & Public Distribution, Law & Legislative Affairs of Manipur, Labour & Employment in 2020–2022.
