= N. Biren Singh =

Chief Minister of Manipur from 2017 to 2025

Nongthombam Biren Singh
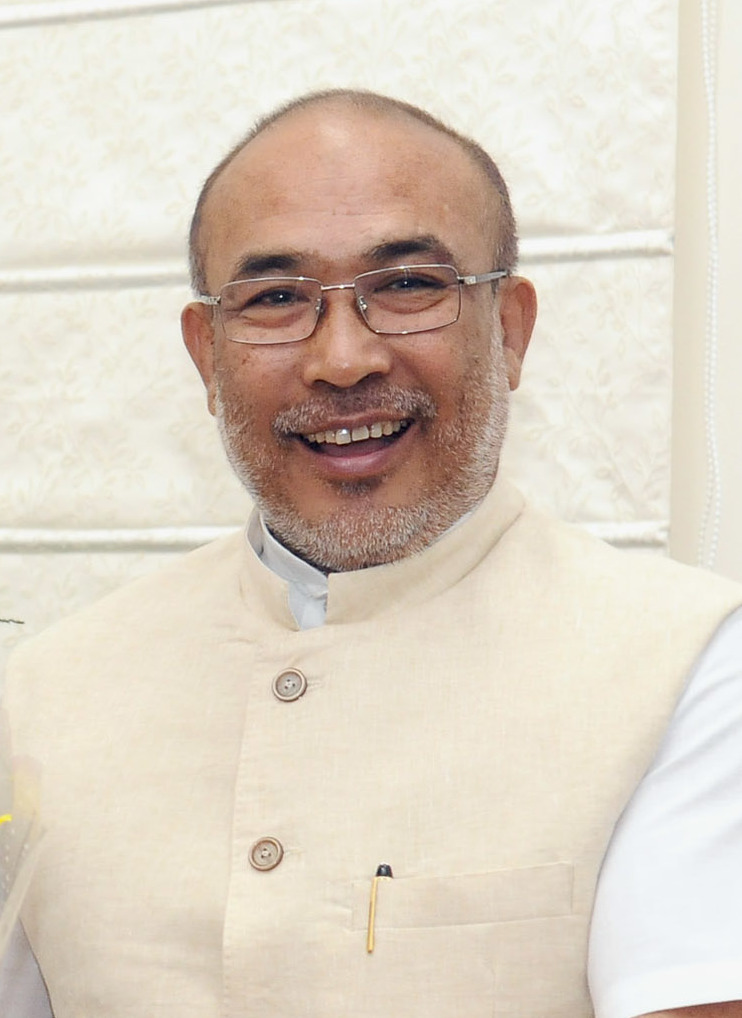
- Biren in 2017

12th Chief Minister of Manipur
- In office 15 March 2017 – 13 February 2025
- Governor: Najma Heptullah; Jagdish Mukhi; Padmanabha Acharya; Ganga Prasad; La Ganesan; Anusuiya Uikey; Lakshaman Acharya; Ajay Kumar Bhalla
- Deputy: Yumnam Joykumar Singh (till 2022)
- Cabinet: First ministry (2017–2022); Second ministry (2022–2025)
- Preceded by: Okram Ibobi Singh
- Succeeded by: President's rule

Member of Manipur Legislative Assembly
- Incumbent
- Assumed office 2002
- Preceded by: Wakambam Thoiba Singh
- Constituency: Heingang

President of Lainingthou Sanamahi Temple Board
- Incumbent
- Assumed office 6 March 2021

Personal details
- Born: 1 January 1961 (age 65) Imphal, Manipur, India
- Party: Bharatiya Janata Party (since 2017); Indian National Congress (2004–2016); Democratic Revolutionary Peoples Party (2002–2004)
- Spouse: Hiyainu Devi
- Children: 3
- Education: Manipur University
- Website: Official website Government website

Military service
- Allegiance: India
- Branch/service: Border Security Force
- Years of service: 1979–1993

Nongthombam Biren Singh (Meitei pronunciation: /nōng-thōm-bam bī-ren sīng/; born 1 January 1961) is an Indian politician, former footballer, and journalist who served as the 12th Chief Minister of Manipur from 2017 to 2025 as a member of the Bharatiya Janata Party. He has represented the Heingang Assembly constituency in the Manipur Legislative Assembly since 2002. Besides being the chairman of Shree Govindaji Temple Board, he is the first incumbent Chief Minister who serves as the president of the Lainingthou Sanamahi Temple Board (LSTB), the temple development board of Lainingthou Sanamahi of the Sanamahi religion since 2021.

Joining politics in 2002, Biren joined the Democratic Revolutionary Peoples Party and won the assembly elections from Heingang. He retained the seat in 2007, contesting on an Indian National Congress ticket after joining the party in 2003. Serving as the Minister of Youth Affairs and Sports, he quit the party in 2016 before joining the Bharatiya Janata Party. In 2017, he retained his seat from Heingang again and was named the Chief Minister after his party gained coalition and formed the government. In 2022 he once again retained his seat from Heingang. He has won the Heingang assembly constituency since 2002. Under Biren Singh's leadership, the BJP not only increased its seat share in the Manipur Assembly, from 21 (in 2017) to 32 (in 2022), but had also managed to weather several storms while running the government in the last five years. Towards the end of his chief ministership, the state under his leadership saw the outbreak of the Manipur violence. His response to the violence received criticism from opposition parties and international observers.

Biren Singh tendered his resignation on 9 February 2025, though he continued to serve as the caretaker chief minister until the President's rule was imposed in the state on 13 February, 2025.

== Early life ==
Born in 1961 in Imphal, Manipur, Singh holds a BA from Manipur University.

== Personal life ==
Singh is married to Hiyainu Devi, with one son and two daughters.

== Early career ==
He began his career as a footballer and got recruited in the Border Security Force (BSF) playing for its team in domestic competitions and was a part of the winning team of Durand Cup in 1981; he also represented Manipur in the Santosh Trophy. He resigned from the BSF and turned to journalism. Despite having had no formal training and experience, he began the Meitei language daily Naharolgi Thoudang in 1992 and worked as the editor till 2001.

== Political career ==
=== Democratic Revolutionary Peoples Party ===
In 2002, he was elected to the Legislative Assembly of Manipur as the Democratic Revolutionary Peoples Party (DRPP) candidate in the constituency of Heingang.

=== Indian National Congress ===
He later joined the Indian National Congress. He was appointed Minister of State of Vigilance in the Manipur state government in May 2003.

In 2007 he retained his Assembly seat, contesting on behalf of the Indian National Congress. He was later appointed the Minister of Irrigation & Flood Control and Youth Affairs & Sports. In 2012 he retained his Assembly seat for the third consecutive term.

In September 2015, Singh stated that the recently passed bill in the Legislative Assembly to protect indigenous peoples would not harm any community in the state.

In October 2016, Singh resigned from the Manipur Legislative Assembly and the Manipur Pradesh Congress Committee, this came after his revolt against Okram Ibobi Singh, the then Chief Minister of Manipur.

=== Bharatiya Janata Party ===
Singh formally joined the BJP on 17 October 2016 and later became the Spokesperson and Co-convener of the Election Management Committee of BJP Manipur Pradesh. He won the 2017 Manipur Legislative Assembly Election from Heingang Assembly Constituency.

==== Chief Minister of Manipur ====
In March 2017, he was elected as leader of the BJP Legislature Party in Manipur and was appointed the Chief Minister of Manipur heading a coalition government that included Naga People's Front (4 seats), National People's Party (4 seats), and Lok Janshakti Party (1 seat). He was sworn in on 15 March 2017. He was the first Chief Minister of Manipur from the BJP.

In January 2018, he laid the foundation stone for the new academic building of Manipur Public School. The project is undertaken by Manipur Minorities and OBC Economic Development Society (MOBEDS). The cost of the project is estimated to be Rs 10.80 crore under the Union Ministry of Minority Affairs and will include new classrooms, a headmaster's room, common rooms, library, laboratories, toilets, and separate hostels for boys and girls.

N. Biren Singh was awarded Champions of Change in 2018 for his exceptional work for the nation. The award was conferred by the Vice-President of India Sri. Venkaiah Naidu at Vigyan Bhavan New Delhi.

On 20 April 2018, Singh launched the First State-Level Ginger Festival at Parbung in Pherzawl District. The festival will remain one of Singh's legacies in the promotion of agriculture in the hill district which is one of the most backward in the state. Farmers have reported that since 2018 they have been able to sell their organic ginger throughout the year.

During the 2020 COVID-19 pandemic in India, Manipur became the third State to declare itself coronavirus-free after the two patients who had tested positive successfully recovered from the virus.

On 17 June 2020, 9 MLAs supporting his government in Manipur revolted against him and withdrew support from his government, blaming him for lack of action during the COVID-19 pandemic. During the vote of confidence, he was one of the eight MLAs who had skipped the assembly proceedings, defying the party whip for the trust vote. All members resigned from Indian National Congress and later joined BJP.

During his administration, nearly 20,000 acres of poppy plantations were destroyed under the initiative of the government's war on drugs, mainly from hilly areas including the Kangpokpi and Ukhrul districts.

In the 2022 Manipur Legislative Assembly election, Biren Singh led the BJP to a clear majority, increasing the seat tally from 21 (2017) to 32 (2022) in an Assembly of 60 and continued as the Chief Minister.

==== 2023-25 ethnic violence ====
Singh's tenure saw the outbreak of ethnic violence between the Meitei and Kuki communities in the state. On 15 August 2023, Singh said that certain misunderstandings, actions of vested interests, and foreign conspiracies to destabilise the state led to widespread violence in Manipur.

On 9 February 2025, after 20 months of intermittent violence, Chief Minister Singh resigned, facing the threat of a no-confidence motion in the impending Manipur Legislative Assembly session. Following his resignation, a President's rule was imposed in the state for a year. It was revoked on 4 February 2026 after Yumnam Khemchand Singh was sworn in as the new chief minister.

== Controversies ==
In January 2017, his son N. Ajay was sentenced to a five-year jail term for the murder of Irom Roger after a traffic-related altercation during Holi in 2011.

== See also ==
- N. Biren Singh ministry
- 2023 Manipur violence

Political offices
| Preceded by Okram Ibobi Singh | Chief Minister of Manipur; 15 March 2017 – Present | Succeeded by Incumbent |
