= Manipur Legislative Assembly =

Unicameral state legislature of Manipur in India

- 12th Manipur Legislative Assembly

Type
- Type: Unicameral of the Manipur Legislative Assembly
- Term limits: 5 years

History
- Founded: 18 October 1952 (74 years ago)

Leadership
- Governor: Ajay Kumar Bhalla
- Speaker: T. Satyabrata Singh, BJP since 22 March 2022
- Deputy Speaker: K. Robindro Singh, BJP since 22 March 2022
- Chief Minister (Leader of the House): Y. Khemchand Singh, BJP since 4 February 2026
- Deputy Chief Minister (Deputy Leader of the House): Nemcha Kipgen,BJP; Losii Dikho,NPF since 4 February 2026
- Leader of the Opposition: Vacant since 30 March 2022

Structure
- Political groups: Government (51) NDA (51): BJP (36); NPP (6); NPF (5); JD(U) (1); IND (3); Opposition (7): INC (5); KPA (2); Vacant (2): Vacant (2)

Elections
- Voting system: First past the post
- Last election: 28 February – 5 March 2022
- Next election: February – March 2027

Meeting place
- Manipur Legislative Assembly, Capital Complex, Thangmeiband, Imphal, Manipur, India-795001

Website
- Manipur Legislative Assembly

The Manipur Legislative Assembly is the unicameral legislature of the Indian state of Manipur.

== Description ==
The seat of the Manipur Legislative Assembly is at Imphal, the capital of the state. It is housed in the Capital Complex in the Thangmeiband locality of Imphal city. The term of the Legislative Assembly is five years, unless dissolved earlier. The Legislative Assembly comprises 60 members who are directly elected from single-seat constituencies, of which 40 are in the Imphal Valley and 20 in the surrounding hill districts. At present, 1 assembly constituency is reserved for candidates belonging to the Scheduled Castes and 19 assembly constituencies are reserved for candidates belonging to the Scheduled tribes. The leader of Opposition is vacant since no other party has a minimum of 6 seats.

== Office bearers ==
S.No	Position	Portrait	Name	Party	Constituency	Office Taken	Reference
1	Speaker		Thokchom Satyabrata Singh	BJP	Yaiskul	22 March 2022	
2	Deputy Speaker		Kongkham Robindro Singh	BJP	Mayang Imphal	22 March 2022	
3	Leader of the House (Chief Minister)		Yumnam Khemchand Singh	BJP	Singjamei	4 February 2026	
4	Deputy Leaders of the House (Deputy Chief Ministers)		Nemcha Kipgen	BJP	Kangpokpi	4 February 2026	
5	Deputy Leaders of the House (Deputy Chief Ministers)		Losii Dikho	NPF	Mao	4 February 2026	
6	Leader of the Opposition		Vacant	N/A	N/A	N/A	

== Members of Legislative Assembly ==
District	No.	Constituency	Name	Party	Alliance	Remarks
Imphal East	1	Khundrakpam	T. Lokeshwar Singh	INC	MPSA	
Imphal East	2	Heingang	N. Biren Singh	BJP	NDA	Resigned On 9 February 2025 as Chief Minister.
Imphal East	3	Khurai	L. Susindro Meitei	BJP	NDA	
Imphal East	4	Kshetrigao	Sheikh Noorul Hassan	NPP	NDA	
Imphal East	5	Thongju	T. Biswajit Singh	BJP	NDA	
Imphal East	6	Keirao	L. Rameshwor Meitei	BJP	NDA	
Imphal East	7	Andro	T. Shyamkumar Singh	BJP	NDA	
Imphal East	8	Lamlai	K. Ibomcha	BJP	NDA	
Imphal West	9	Thangmeiband	K. Joykisan Singh	JD(U)	NDA	Switched from JD(U) to BJP
Imphal West	9	Thangmeiband	K. Joykisan Singh	BJP	NDA	Switched from JD(U) to BJP
Imphal West	10	Uripok	K. Raghumani Singh	BJP	NDA	
Imphal West	11	Sagolband	Rajkumar Imo Singh	BJP	NDA	
Imphal West	12	Keishamthong	Sapam Nishikant Singh	IND	NDA	
Imphal West	13	Singjamei	Yumnam Khemchand Singh	BJP	NDA	Chief Minister since 4 February 2026
Imphal East	14	Yaiskul	T. Satyabrata Singh	BJP	NDA	
Imphal East	15	Wangkhei	Thangjam Arunkumar	JD(U)	NDA	Switched from JD(U) to BJP
Imphal East	15	Wangkhei	Thangjam Arunkumar	BJP	NDA	Switched from JD(U) to BJP
Imphal West	16	Sekmai (SC)	Heikham Dingo Singh	BJP	NDA	
Imphal West	17	Lamsang	Sorokhaibam Rajen	BJP	NDA	
Imphal West	18	Konthoujam	Sapam Ranjan Singh	BJP	NDA	
Imphal West	19	Patsoi	Sapam Kunjakeswor Singh	BJP	NDA	
Imphal West	20	Langthabal	Karam Shyam	BJP	NDA	
Imphal West	21	Naoriya Pakhanglakpa	Soraisam Kebi Devi	BJP	NDA	
Imphal West	22	Wangoi	Khuraijam Loken Singh	NPP	NDA	
Imphal West	23	Mayang Imphal	Kongkham Robindro Singh	BJP	NDA	
Bishnupur	24	Nambol	T. Basanta Kumar Singh	BJP	NDA	
Bishnupur	25	Oinam	Irengbam Nalini Devi	NPP	NDA	
Bishnupur	26	Bishnupur	Govindas Konthoujam	BJP	NDA	
Bishnupur	27	Moirang	Thongam Shanti Singh	NPP	NDA	
Bishnupur	28	Thanga	Tongbram Robindro Singh	BJP	NDA	
Bishnupur	29	Kumbi	S. Premachandra Singh	BJP	NDA	
Thoubal	30	Lilong	Muhammad Abdul Nasir	JD(U)	NDA	
Thoubal	31	Thoubal	Okram Ibobi Singh	INC	MPSA	
Thoubal	32	Wangkhem	K. Meghachandra Singh	INC	MPSA	
Thoubal	33	Heirok	T. Radheshyam Singh	BJP	NDA	
Thoubal	34	Wangjing Tentha	Paonam Brojen	BJP	NDA	
Thoubal	35	Khangabok	Surjakumar Okram	INC	MPSA	
Thoubal	36	Wabgai	Usham Deben Singh	BJP	NDA	
Thoubal	37	Kakching	M. Rameshwar Singh	NPP	NDA	
Thoubal	38	Hiyanglam	Yumnam Radheshyam	BJP	NDA	
Thoubal	39	Sugnu	Kangujam Ranjit Singh	INC	MPSA	
Imphal East	40	Jiribam	Ashab Uddin	JD(U)	NDA	Switched from JD(U) to BJP
Imphal East	40	Jiribam	Ashab Uddin	BJP	NDA	Switched from JD(U) to BJP
Chandel	41	Chandel (ST)	Olish Shilshi	BJP	NDA	
Chandel	42	Tengnoupal (ST)	Letpao Haokip	BJP	NDA	
Ukhrul	43	Phungyar (ST)	Leishiyo Keishing	NPF	NDA	
Ukhrul	44	Ukhrul (ST)	Ram Muivah	NPF	NDA	
Ukhrul	45	Chingai (ST)	Khashim Vashum	NPF	NDA	
Senapati	46	Saikul (ST)	K. Haokip Hangshing	KPA	Others	
Senapati	47	Karong (ST)	J. Kumo Sha	IND	NDA	
Senapati	48	Mao (ST)	Losii Dikho	NPF	NDA	Deputy Chief Minister since 4 February 2026
Senapati	49	Tadubi (ST)	N. Kayisii	NPP	NDA	Died on 18 January 2025
Senapati	49	Tadubi (ST)	Vacant			
Senapati	50	Kangpokpi	Nemcha Kipgen	BJP	NDA	Deputy Chief Minister since 4 February 2026
Senapati	51	Saitu (ST)	Haokholet Kipgen	IND	NDA	
Tamenglong	52	Tamei (ST)	Awangbow Newmai	NPF	NDA	
Tamenglong	53	Tamenglong (ST)	Janghemlung Panmei	NPP	NDA	
Tamenglong	54	Nungba (ST)	Dinganglung Gangmei	BJP	NDA	
Churachandpur	55	Tipaimukh (ST)	Ngursanglur Sanate	JD(U)	NDA	Switched from JD(U) to BJP
Churachandpur	55	Tipaimukh (ST)	Ngursanglur Sanate	BJP	NDA	Switched from JD(U) to BJP
Churachandpur	56	Thanlon (ST)	Vungzagin Valte	BJP	NDA	Died on 20 February 2026
Churachandpur	56	Thanlon (ST)	Vacant			
Churachandpur	57	Henglep (ST)	Letzamang Haokip	BJP	NDA	
Churachandpur	58	Churachandpur (ST)	L. M. Khaute	JD(U)	NDA	Switched from JD(U) to BJP
Churachandpur	58	Churachandpur (ST)	L. M. Khaute	BJP	NDA	Switched from JD(U) to BJP
Churachandpur	59	Saikot (ST)	Paolienlal Haokip	BJP	NDA	
Churachandpur	60	Singhat (ST)	Chinlunthang Manlun	KPA	Others	

== Past Composition ==
1967–1972

1	4	16	9
CPI	SSP	INC	Ind

1972–1974

5	3	17	15	1	19
CPI	SP	INC (I)	MPP	INC (O)	Ind

1974–1980

6	2	13	12	2	20	5
CPI	SP	INC (I)	MHU	KNA	MPP	Ind

1980–1984

1	5	13	6	2	10	4	19
CPI (M)	CPI	INC (I)	INC (U)	KNA	JP	MPP	Ind

1984–1990

1	30	1	4	3	21
CPI	INC	KNA	JP	MPP	Ind

1990–1995

3	4	11	24	2	10
CPI	ICS (SCS)	JD	INC	KNA	MPP

1995-2000

2	2	1	7	22	2	18	2	1	3
CPI	SAP	IC (S)	JD	INC	FPM	MPP	MSCP	BJP	Ind

2000-2002

1	1	1	1	11	6	5	4	23	6	1
RJD	SAP	JD (U)	JD (S)	INC	FPM	NCP	MPP	MSCP	BJP	Ind

2002-2007

5	3	20	2	13	1	3	2	7	4
CPI	SAP	INC	DRPP	FPM	MNC	NCP	MPP	MSCP	BJP

2007-2012

4	3	30	5	8	10
CPI	RJD	INC	NCP	MPP	Ind

2012-2017

7	42	1	1	5	4
AITC	INC	LJP	NCP	MSCP	NPF

2017-2022

1	28	1	4	4	21	1
AITC	INC	LJP	NPP	NPF	BJP	Ind

2022-Present

6	5	2	7	5	32	3
JD (U)	INC	KPA	NPP	NPF	BJP	Ind

== See also ==
- List of districts of Manipur
- List of constituencies of the Manipur Legislative Assembly
- 2022 Manipur Legislative Assembly election
