= List of populated places in Thoubal district =

Villages in Thoubal district of Manipur, India

The Thoubal district of Manipur state in India has two subdivisions. At the time of the 2011 Census of India, the Kakching district (split in 2016) was a part of the Thoubal district.

== Subdivisions ==
The Thoubal district has two subdivisions with six tehsils or circles:

- Lilong subdivision: Irong Chesaba and Lilong
- Thoubal subdivision: Thoubal, Yairipok, Heirok, and Khongjom

It has three community development blocks (CD blocks) with 27 gram panchayats:

- Lilong
  - Khekman
  - Maibam Uchiwa
  - Oinam Sawombung
  - Turen Ahanbi
  - Charangpat
  - Wangkhem
- Thoubal
  - Leisangthem
  - Moijing
  - Khangabok Part I
  - Khangabok Part II
  - Khangabok Part III
  - Wangbal
  - Sangaiyumpham I
  - Sangaiyumpham II
- Wangjing Tentha
  - Heirok Part I
  - Heirok Part II
  - Heirok Part III
  - Langathel
  - Kangyambem
  - Salungpham
  - Sapam
  - Samaram
  - Tekcham
  - Leirongthel Ningel
  - Lourembam
  - Tentha

== Towns ==
The Thoubal district has 6 municipal councils: at the time of the 2011 census, Wangjing Lamding Municipal Council did not exist, and four others (those except Thoubal) were classified as Nagar Panchayats.

Name	Type	Block	Population	Effective literacy rate	Sex ratio	SC population %	ST population %	Census code (2011)
Lilong (Thoubal)	Municipal Council	Lilong	22888	75.68%	988	0.0%	0.98%	801476
Samurou	Nagar Panchayat	Lilong	5861	84.95%	1007	0.0%	0.03%	801488
Heirok	Municipal Council	Thoubal	2974	71.67%	1029	0.0%	0.0%	801477
Thoubal	Municipal Council	Thoubal	45947	82.83%	1002	1.46%	0.18%	801479
Sikhong Sekmai	Municipal Council	Thoubal	7390	69.68%	1025	0.0%	0.08%	801480
Yairipok	Municipal Council	Thoubal	9569	82.2%	991	0.0%	0.02%	801481
Wangjing (now combined with Lamding to form a Municipal Council)	Nagar Panchayat	Thoubal	8055	81.44%	1073	0.0%	0.01%	801478

== Villages ==
The villages in the Thoubal district include:

=== Lilong subdivision ===
==== Irong Chesaba SDC Circle ====
Name	Population	Effective literacy rate	Sex ratio	SC population %	ST population %	Census code (2011)
Hangool (Hangul)	1752	66.6%	921	0.0%	0.0%	269924
Hayel	2653	70.64%	910	0.0%	0.0%	269923
Uchiwa	3385	61.13%	1059	0.0%	0.0%	269917
Maibam Konjil	5696	68.11%	1063	0.0%	0.0%	269918
Irong Chesaba	6749	65.09%	1001	0.0%	0.0%	269919
Irong Thokchom	645	81.82%	1003	0.0%	0.0%	269920
Thoudam	1884	71.26%	1035	0.0%	0.0%	269921
Leisangthem (Leishangthem)	6118	73.77%	1007	0.0%	0.0%	269922

==== Lilong SDC Circle ====
Name	Population	Effective literacy rate	Sex ratio	SC population %	ST population %	Census code (2011)
Khekman	7157	66.04%	962	0.0%	0.0%	269925
Moijing	7428	66.48%	1002	0.0%	0.0%	269926
Nungei	2074	59.77%	1029	0.0%	0.0%	269927
Atoukhong	1611	82.9%	982	0.0%	0.0%	269928
Oinam	2377	77.53%	956	0.0%	0.0%	269929
Laiphrakpam (Leiprakphm)	1093	81.76%	945	0.0%	0.0%	269930
Haoreibi (Houreibi)	3218	76.14%	1032	0.0%	0.0%	269931
Lilong (Thoubal) (part)	3352	71.85%	959	0.0%	0.0%	269932
Chaobok	1436	82.88%	1008	0.0%	14.83%	269933

The following village is not listed in the 2011 census directory: Kayam Siphai.

=== Thoubal subdivision ===
==== Thoubal SDC circle ====
Name	Population	Effective literacy rate	Sex ratio	SC population %	ST population %	Census code (2011)
Nepra Company (Nepra Comapany)	593	73.48%	983	0.0%	0.0%	269940
Charangpat Maklang	3535	79.01%	1026	0.0%	0.14%	269941
Khangabok	16344	72.0%	1007	0.06%	0.02%	269944
Hayel Labuk (Hayelloubuk)	1758	71.06%	951	0.0%	0.0%	269939
Bengi	807	74.69%	1091	0.0%	0.0%	269942
Wangbal	2420	78.65%	1040	0.0%	0.45%	269975
Uyal	1267	80.6%	1014	0.0%	0.0%	269976
Icham Kunou (Icham Thana)	664	81.24%	897	0.0%	0.0%	269943

The following villages are not listed in the 2011 census directory:

- Yaithibi
- Haokha Maning
- Haokha Mamang
- Sabaltongba
- Okram Hanjaba
- Nongangkhong
- Okram Wangmataba
- Thoubal Wangmataba
- Thoubal Achouba
- Kshetrileikai
- Athokpam
- Phoudel

==== Khongjom SDC circle ====
Name	Population	Effective literacy rate	Sex ratio	SC population %	ST population %	Census code (2011)
Lamding (now combined with Wangjing to form a Municipal Council)	1587	74.3%	1011	0.0%	0.0%	269948
Sangaiyumpham (Sanggaiyumpham)	11311	62.76%	981	0.0%	0.0%	269946
Tentha	9087	69.32%	1023	0.01%	0.01%	269947
Kang Samaram	3369	68.64%	1025	0.03%	0.03%	269986
Cherapur (Chirapur)	3193	77.0%	981	0.0%	0.0%	269952
Khongjom	2334	68.63%	1056	0.0%	0.0%	269958
Chingtham	1391	72.98%	959	0.0%	0.0%	269959
Tekcham	3825	68.42%	1011	0.13%	0.0%	269951
Yaithibi Khunou	548	64.78%	923	80.47%	0.0%	269953
Langathel	4742	50.22%	960	0.0%	0.02%	269954
Phundrei	3087	55.37%	1022	0.0%	0.0%	269955
Lamlong	0	NA	NA	NA	NA	269956
Langol	0	NA	NA	NA	NA	269957
Sapam (Sapam Leikai)	3442	78.97%	1038	0.0%	0.03%	269950
Papal (Sapam Papal)	1133	74.74%	995	0.0%	0.0%	269945

==== Heirok SDC Circle ====
Name	Population	Effective literacy rate	Sex ratio	SC population %	ST population %	Census code (2011)
Thokchom	697	79.65%	1074	0.0%	0.0%	269974
Kairembikhok	1779	78.9%	1054	0.0%	0.0%	269977
Kangthokchao	2162	69.66%	994	0.0%	0.0%	269978
Kangyambem	3090	75.19%	1059	0.1%	0.13%	269979
Heirok Part I (part)	9574	64.73%	925	0.04%	0.02%	269981
Heirok Part II (part)	6205	70.74%	1029	0.0%	0.0%	269982
Chingdompok	1146	75.49%	1028	0.0%	0.0%	269983
Kangdabi	0	NA	NA	NA	NA	269984
Purnaheitupokpi (Purna Heituppokpi)	1131	80.66%	981	0.0%	0.0%	269980

==== Yairipok SDC Circle ====
Name	Population	Effective literacy rate	Sex ratio	SC population %	ST population %	Census code (2011)
Charangpat Mamang	2834	77.67%	999	0.0%	0.0%	269968
Wangkhem	5235	81.73%	1010	0.0%	0.02%	269969
Pechi	830	87.06%	1015	0.0%	0.0%	269970
Khoirom	4037	76.71%	984	0.0%	0.0%	269971
Leirongthel	2038	70.53%	971	0.0%	0.0%	269964
Chandrakhong	1162	62.03%	1082	0.0%	1.46%	269962
Phanjangkhong	235	54.95%	1043	0.0%	0.0%	269961
Ningel	338	84.62%	1112	0.0%	0.0%	269963
Kakmayai (Kak Mayai)	657	68.69%	1003	0.0%	0.0%	269965
Lourembam	1050	90.76%	920	0.0%	0.0%	269966
Langmeithel (Langmeithet)	931	77.19%	904	0.0%	0.0%	269967
Bumpa Khullen (Bumpa Khullen)	0	NA	NA	NA	NA	269960

The following villages are not listed in the 2011 census directory:

- Keirambi
- Bishnunaha
- Bamon Lekai
- Kekru
- Sekmaikumbi
- Shikhong
- Ukhongsang

=== Other ===
The following villages of Thoubal block, listed in the 2011 census, no longer appear on the district website:

Name	Population	Effective literacy rate	Sex ratio	SC population %	ST population %	Census code (2011)
Thoubal Khunou	179	77.92%	827	58.1%	0.0%	269938
Wangjing (village, distinct from town of the same name)	2960	69.79%	1034	0.0%	0.0%	269949
Ingourok	593	68.9%	1103	0.0%	0.0%	269972
Poirou Tangkhul	0	NA	NA	NA	NA	269973
Saram Tangkhul	75	72.86%	974	0.0%	100.0%	269985
