= National Highway 102B (India) =

National highway in India

National Highway 102B
- Map of National Highway 102B in red
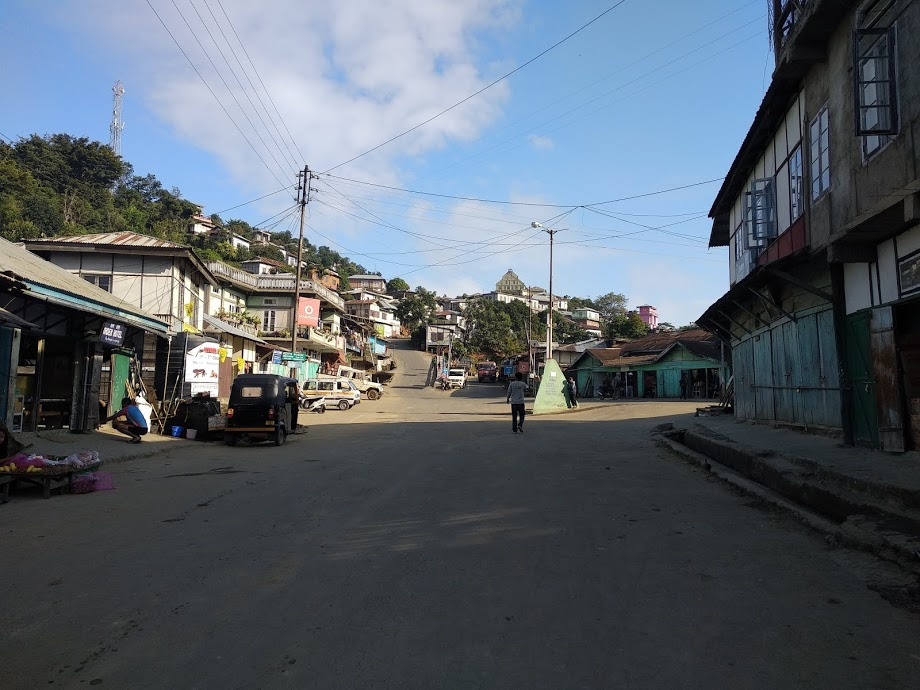

Route information
- Auxiliary route of NH 102
- Maintained by NHAI
- Length: 323 km (201 mi)

Major junctions
- North end: NH 2 in Churachandpur
- South end: NH 6 in Keifang

Location
- Country: India
- States: Manipur, Mizoram

Highway system
- Roads in India; Expressways; National; State; Asian
← NH 102A	→ NH 102C

National Highway 102B (NH 102B), also known as Guite Road, is a national highway in India in the states of Manipur and Mizoram. It is a spur road of National Highway 2 that branches out at Churachandpur and connects to National Highway 6 near Keifang in Mizoram. Guite Road is a historical name for the route, which is retained by the Gazette Order no.46/9/80-W(Pt), dated 01.07.1985 of Government of Manipur.

== Route description ==
Manipur

Churachandpur, Singngat, Suangdoh, Mualnuam, Sinzawl, Tuivai Road.

Mizoram

Khawkawn, North East Khawdungsei, Ngopa, Pawlrang, Hliappui, Saichal, NH 6, near Saitual.

== Major intersections ==
NH 2 Terminal near Churachandpur.
NH 6 Terminal near Keifang.

== See also ==
- List of national highways in India
- List of national highways in India by state
