= Kakyen =

Ancient Meitei legendary giant bird

Kakyen (King of the birds)
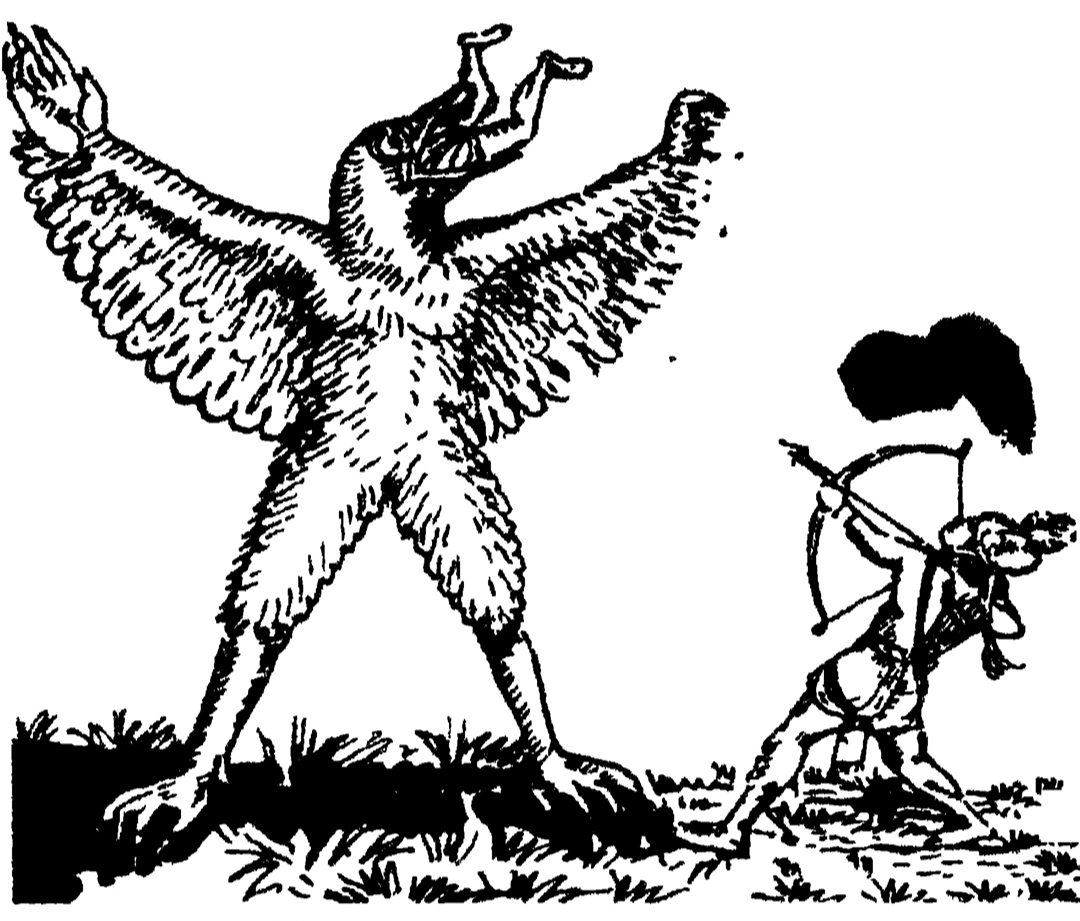
- Kakyen Mingamba - Tyrannical monstrous gigantic colossal cannibalistic bird - swallowing Meitei Elder Prince Yoimongba in front of Younger Prince Taothingmang

Creature information
- Other names: Kakyen Mingamba; Kakyel Meengamba; Kwaak Kakyen Mingamba (Meitei: /kwāk kak-yen mī-ngam-ba/); Kwaak Kakyel Mingamba (Meitei: /kwāk kak-yel mī-ngam-ba/)
- Grouping: birds
- Similar entities: Phoenix (mythology), Pebets, Uchek Langmeitong, Roc (mythology)
- Folklore: Meitei mythology and folklore

Origin
- First attested: during the time of King Kangba
- Country: Ancient Kangleipak (historical); India (present)
- Region: Kangleipak (present day Manipur)

Kakyen (Meitei: ꯀꯛꯌꯦꯟ), also known as Kakyen Mingamba (Meitei: ꯀꯛꯌꯦꯟ ꯃꯤꯉꯝꯕ) or Kakyel Meengamba (Meitei: ꯀꯛꯌꯦꯜ ꯃꯤꯉꯝꯕꯥ), was a big man-eating bird mentioned in Meitei mythology, folklore and history of Kangleipak (Manipur). According to legends, it used to serve King Kangba. It used to eat dead bodies thrown at the water bodies, especially a river near Heibok Ching. It was best known for having a fight with two Meitei princes, Taothingmang and Yoimongba. It was later killed by the two brothers.

According to the Sakok Lamlen Ahanba (Meitei: ꯁꯥꯀꯣꯛ ꯂꯝꯂꯦꯟ ꯑꯍꯥꯟꯕ) text, Kakyen was mentioned as the king of the birds and was named as "Thilpai Ngamba Thinungkhak" (Meitei: ꯊꯤꯜꯄꯥꯏ ꯉꯝꯕ ꯊꯤꯅꯨꯡꯈꯥꯛ).

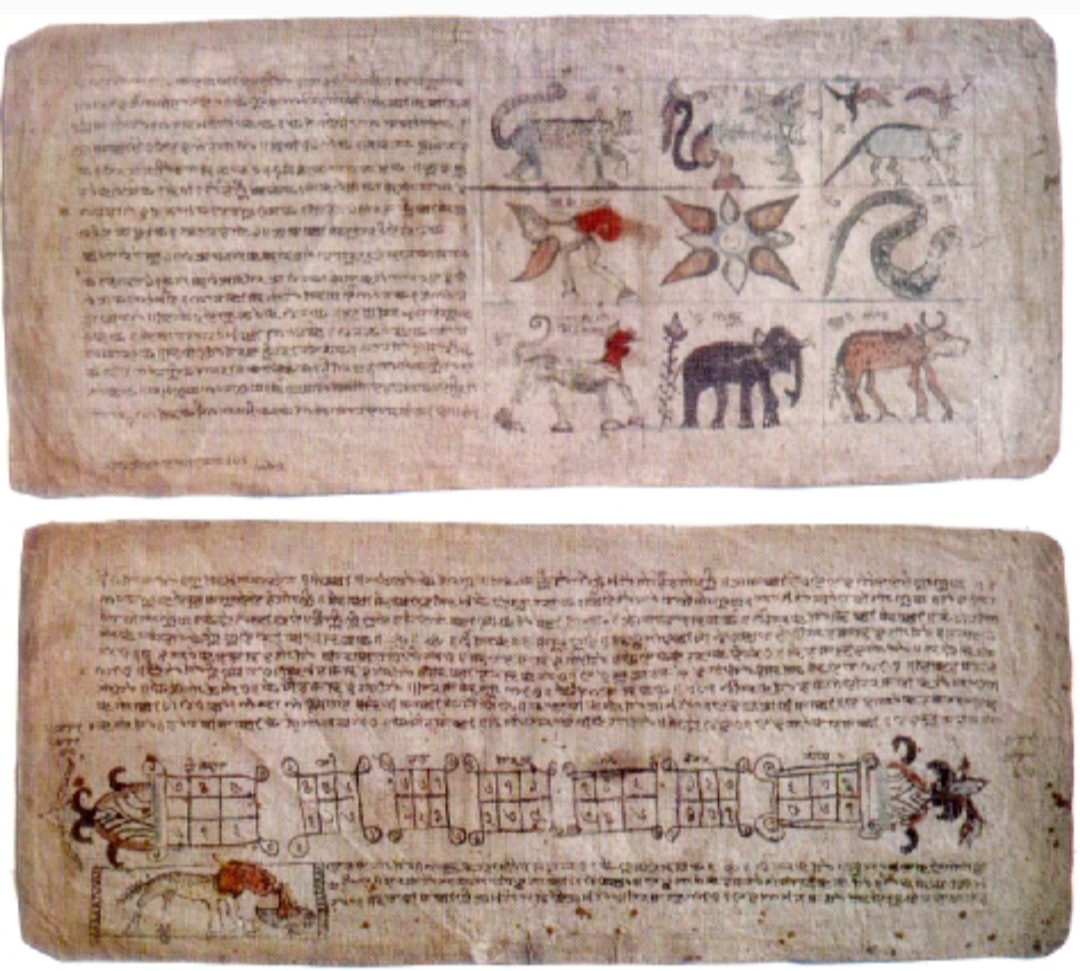
Depictions of kakyen bird and other animals and the moon in the "Subika Laisaba" (Meitei: ꯁꯨꯕꯤꯀꯥ ꯂꯥꯏꯁꯥꯕ) book

Kakyen was mentioned in the Tutenglon (Meitei: ꯇꯨꯇꯦꯡꯂꯣꯟ) text. The book was about the heroic works of the two Meitei princes, Yoimongba and Taothingmang.

== Story ==
Once Kakyen started killing many people and destroying many villages, including Lokha Haokha area (Meitei: ꯂꯣꯛꯈꯥ ꯍꯥꯎꯈꯥ) in ancient Kangleipak. The people requested Taothingmang (Meitei: ꯇꯥꯎꯊꯤꯡꯃꯥꯡ) and Yoimongba (Meitei: ꯌꯣꯏꯃꯣꯡꯕ), the two sons of Khuyoi Tompok (Meitei: ꯈꯨꯌꯣꯏ ꯇꯣꯝꯄꯣꯛ), the then King of Kangleipak, to kill the bird to save them. So, the two royal brothers worshipped goddess Leimarel (Leimalel). The goddess blessed the two men with a divine bow (along with a quiver full of arrows) and a divine sword. Later, they met the bird. Yoimongba held the sword and Taothingmang held the bow and arrows (in the quiver). Kakyen swallowed prince Yoimongba. Taothingmang shot his arrows to the bird. The bird flew away. Inside its body, Yoimongba cut the bird using his sword. Later, the bird was killed. One of its wings was chopped off.

In another version of the story, goddess Leimarel suggested the brothers worship goddess Panthoibi (Meitei: ꯄꯣꯟꯊꯣꯏꯕꯤ) to get the weapons. And the boys did so.

== Nomenclature of places ==
One of the Kakyen bird's chopped off wings was used to stop the flow of water as a dam. That place was later known as "Ithing" (Meitei: ꯏꯊꯤꯡ). The place where the bird was beheaded was called "Kaklou" (Meitei: ꯀꯛꯂꯧ).

The place where Kakyen was killed was also known as "Kakyen Phabi" (Meitei: ꯀꯛꯌꯦꯟ ꯐꯥꯕꯤ).

== Festival ==
The killing of the Kakyen was celebrated as a part of the festival of Mera Chaorel Houba (Meitei: ꯃꯦꯔꯥ ꯆꯥꯎꯔꯦꯜ ꯍꯧꯕ), including the Mera Hou Chongba (Meitei: ꯃꯦꯔꯥ ꯍꯧ ꯆꯣꯡꯕ) by the Meitei people and the tribal people of Kangleipak (present day Manipur). The body of the Kakyen was cut into pieces and cooked by the people. Both Meitei people and the tribal people of Kangleipak together had a big feast of the Kakyen meat. However, as there would be no more Kakyen, but they still wanted to celebrate the festival next year, they collectively decided to have feasts on cattle meat instead from the coming years. For the event, they annually sacrificed seven big cattle animals to the gods, and later ate the meat. The ceremony was known as "mera santuba" (Meitei: ꯃꯦꯔꯥ ꯁꯟꯇꯨꯕ).

== In popular culture ==
- The Tales of Kanglei Throne, an English language book by Linthoi Chanu

== See also ==
- Birds in Meitei culture
- Animals in Meitei culture
- Hills and mountains in Meitei culture
- Keibu Keioiba
- Kangla Sha
- Nongshaba
- Poubi Lai
- Taoroinai
