= Wangkhem =

Wangkhem is a Meitei family name. Notable people with the surname are:

- Wangkhem Khogen Singh, Indian football player and current head coach of I-League club NEROCA
- Wangkhem Sandhyarani Devi, Indian martial art athlete
- Basant Kumar Wangkhem, Indian politician
- Vivek Raj Wangkhem, Indian politician
- Kishorechandra Wangkhem, Indian journalist

== See also ==
- Wangkhem Assembly constituency
