= Iramsiphai =

Village in Manipur, India

Coordinates: 24.6640°N 93.9219°E

Iramsiphai is a village situated in Manipur. The village is separated into two parts by the Imphal River. The northern part of the village belongs to Thoubal district and the southern part belongs to the Imphal West district of Manipur. The Thoubal part belongs to the Lilong Constituency and the Imphal West part comes under the Wangoi Assembly constituency.
