= Yoimongba =

- Meitei Prince
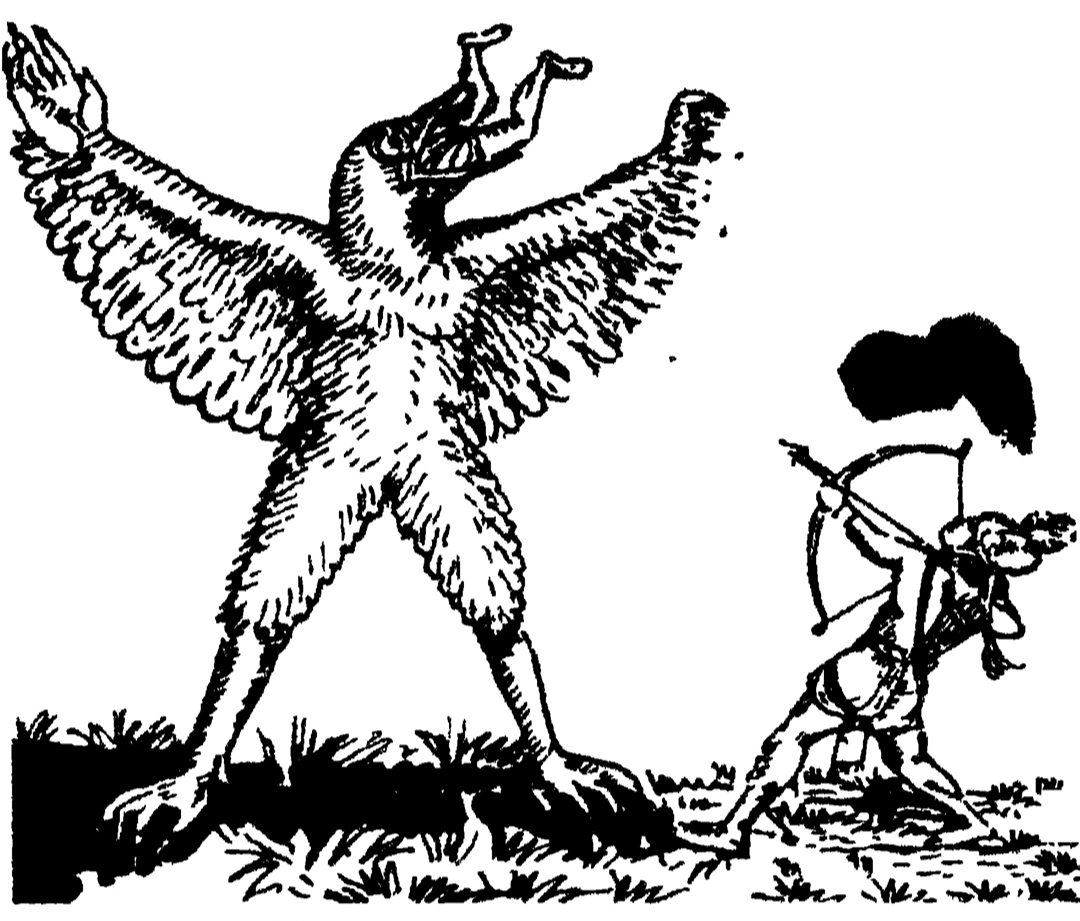
- Yoimongba being swallowed by the mythical bird, Kakyen, while Taothingmang is trying to shoot the bird.
- Born: Kangleipak
- Died: Kangleipak
Names
- Ngangoi Yoimongba
Era name and dates
- Ancient Kangleipak: 3rd century C.E
- House: Ningthouja dynasty
- Father: Khuyoi Tompok
- Religion: Sanamahism
- Occupation: Prince of Kangleipak

Yoimongba was a Meitei prince of the Ningthouja dynasty of Kangleipak (early Manipur). He is mentioned in the Toreirol Lambuba and the Tutenglon, where he is seen with his younger brother Taothingmang. These classic writings narrate the experiences and journeys of the two siblings, detailing their travels, challenges, and the beginnings of naming of various places in Manipur. In 266 CE, he appointed several clan rulers of Luwang, Khuman, Angom, and Moirang.

== Family ==
Ngangoi Yoimongba was the eldest son of King Khuyoi Tompok of the Ningthouja dynasty, and the elder brother of Taothingmang and Lairoklembi. The mother of the three children was Queen Nongmainu Ahongbee.

Taothingmang succeeded his father, (Note: There was no system of primogeniture in ancient Kangleipak.) whereas Lairoklembi was married to the Chief of Koubru.

== Early deeds ==
Ngangoi Yoimongba secretly went out at night to find the nest of a massive bird called Kakyen. However, the bird quickly bore him off as if he were a small chicken. His younger brother, Taothingmang, expert at net throwing, was close by and chased the bird.

== River-clearing mission ==
In the story, Yoimongba entrusted the Iril River to Taothingmang, as it was easier to manage. The Iril had cleaner banks, fewer long grasses, and no large pieces of wood. Yoimongba himself took charge of the more difficult Imphal River.

To maintain happiness while dredging the river, Yoimongba carried various chirping birds. Their happy noises motivated him to work quicker, and he quickly surpassed his younger brother. He subsequently arrived in Lilong and encountered Phunal Telheiba, who informed him that he is not allowed to dig a river on his land.

Later, Yoimongba and Taothingmang met again at a place now called Iril Lilong. From there, they continued to work together. The place where the Iril River and Imphal River met is called Iril Lilong.

== Defeating the enormous bird ==
While journeying south, they came upon a remote village that had roughly one hundred families living there. A senior woman from the locality told them that a large bird had been attacking the villagers. The being thrived on human carcasses and lived in a nearby cavity. Consequently, nobody left their homes. She warned that the princes could be consumed just like baby chicks in its hold.

The two siblings first tried to build a large nest to catch the bird. Nonetheless, the woman told them that this method would not work. They had to pray to Leimarel Sidabi, the caring goddess, and ask for her sword and arrow.

These sacred weapons were overly powerful for ordinary people. In truth, they were so powerful that they split the boat carrying them apart. Under the goddess's direction, Taothingmang partook in intense religious practices and fasted for a month. Eventually, they were finally allowed to use the weapons.

== Battle with the bird ==
The brothers then traveled further south to find the bird’s hiding place. As they moved, the giant bird suddenly attacked and carried away Yoimongba.

In response, Taothingmang shot the bird with the divine arrow. The bird, wounded and with its wings broken, spun down to the ground. Then, Taothingmang killed it completely with the sword. In the end, the settlement of the Lokkha-Haokhas were subdued into the Meitei polity.

== Bibliography ==
- Moyon, Rev Dr Koningthung Ngoru (2023-11-16). The Lost Kingdom of Moyon (Bujuur): Iruwng (King) Kuurkam Ngoruw Moyon & The People of Manipur. Shashwat Publication. ISBN 978-81-19517-31-2.
- Tensuba, Keerti Chand (1993). Genesis of Indian Tribes: An Approach to the History of Meiteis and Thais. Inter-India Publications. ISBN 978-81-210-0308-7.
