= Hliappui S =

- village
- Location in Mizoram, India Hliappui S (India)
- Coordinates: 23.7235114°N 93.114935°E
- Country: India
- State: Mizoram
- District: Champhai
- Block: Ngopa
- Elevation: 1,451 m (4,760 ft)

Population (2011)
  - Total: 16
- Time zone: UTC+5:30 (IST)
- 2011 census code: 271303

Hliappui S is a village in the Champhai district of Mizoram, India. It is located in the Ngopa R.D. Block.

== Demographics ==
According to the 2011 census of India, Hliappui S has only 2 households. The effective literacy rate (i.e. the literacy rate of population excluding children aged 6 and below) is 100%.

Demographics (2011 Census)
	Total	Male	Female
Population	16	7	9
Children aged below 6 years	5	3	2
Scheduled caste	0	0	0
Scheduled tribe	16	7	9
Literates	11	4	7
Workers (all)	9	4	5
Main workers (total)	9	4	5
Main workers: Cultivators	9	4	5
Main workers: Agricultural labourers	0	0	0
Main workers: Household industry workers	0	0	0
Main workers: Other	0	0	0
Marginal workers (total)	0	0	0
Marginal workers: Cultivators	0	0	0
Marginal workers: Agricultural labourers	0	0	0
Marginal workers: Household industry workers	0	0	0
Marginal workers: Others	0	0	0
Non-workers	7	3	4
