= Kairembikhok, Manipur =

Kairembikhok
- Village
- Location in Manipur, India Kairembikhok (India)
- Coordinates: 24.599830°N 94.056848°E
- Country: India
- State: Manipur
- District: Thoubal

Population (2011)
  - Total: 1,779

Languages
  - Official: Meiteilon (Manipuri)
- Time zone: UTC+5:30 (IST)
- PIN: 795148
- Telephone code: 03848
- Vehicle registration: MN
- Website: manipur.gov.in

Kairembikhok is a village in Thoubal District in Manipur, India.

== About Kairembikhok ==
Kairembikhok is a village located in Thoubal district in the Indian state of Manipur.

The village comes under Wangbal panchayat. Thoubal is the sub-district headquarters and the distance from the village is 9 km (5.6 mi). The District headquarters of the village is Thoubal which is 9 km away.

== Geography ==
The nearest town is Wangjing, 3 km away.

== Economy ==
The majority of the population practice agriculture and carpentry. Kairembikhok is known for the production of furniture items.

== Connectivity ==
Four inter-village roads connect Kairembikhok with other part of the district:

- Wangjing Kairembikhok road
- Wangbal Kairembikhok road
- Salungpham Kairembikhok road
- Heirok Kairembikhok road

== Politics ==
Wangjing Tentha assembly constituency (Assembly Constituency No. 34) is part of Outer Manipur (Lok Sabha constituency).
