= National Highway 102C (India) =

National highway in India

National Highway 102C
- Map of National Highway 102C in red

Route information
- Auxiliary route of NH 102
- Maintained by NHAI
- Length: 20 km (12 mi)

Major junctions
- North end: NH 102 in Pallel
- South end: Chandel

Location
- Country: India
- States: Manipur

Highway system
- Roads in India; Expressways; National; State; Asian
← NH 102B	→ NH 202

National Highway 102C, commonly referred to as NH 102C is a national highway in India. It is a spur road of National Highway 102. NH-102C traverses the state of Manipur in India.

== Route description ==
Pallel - Chandel.

== Major intersections ==
NH 102 Terminal near Palel.

== See also ==
- List of national highways in India
- List of national highways in India by state
