= Vivek Raj Wangkhem =

Indian politician (died 2021)

Member of the Manipur Legislative Assembly
- In office 2002–2007
- Succeeded by: Thangjam Nandakishor Singh
- Constituency: Kshetrigao

Personal details
- Died: 17 May 2021
- Party: National People's Party
- Other political affiliations: Manipur State Congress Party

Vivek Raj Wangkhem (died 17 May 2021) was an Indian politician from Manipur. He was elected to the Manipur Legislative Assembly from Kshetrigao Assembly constituency in 2002 as a member of the Manipur State Congress Party and served till 2007.

He later served as the General Secretary of the National People's Party. Wangkhem died from COVID-19 on 17 May 2021, aged 47.
