= NH 102 =

NH 102 may refer to:

- National Highway 102 (India)
- New Hampshire Route 102, United States
