= Changzawl =

- village
- Location in Mizoram, India Changzawl (India)
- Coordinates: 23.7587916°N 93.0782831°E
- Country: India
- State: Mizoram
- District: Champhai
- Block: Ngopa
- Elevation: 1,110 m (3,640 ft)

Population (2011)
  - Total: 452
- Time zone: UTC+5:30 (IST)
- 2011 census code: 271301

Changzawl is a village in the Champhai district of Mizoram, India. It is located in the Ngopa R.D. Block.

== Demographics ==
According to the 2011 census of India, Changzawl has 106 households. The effective literacy rate (i.e. the literacy rate of population excluding children aged 6 and below) is 93.92%.

Demographics (2011 Census)
	Total	Male	Female
Population	452	255	197
Children aged below 6 years	57	32	25
Scheduled caste	0	0	0
Scheduled tribe	437	244	193
Literates	371	214	157
Workers (all)	301	168	133
Main workers (total)	247	156	91
Main workers: Cultivators	190	122	68
Main workers: Agricultural labourers	3	1	2
Main workers: Household industry workers	2	2	0
Main workers: Other	52	31	21
Marginal workers (total)	54	12	42
Marginal workers: Cultivators	11	3	8
Marginal workers: Agricultural labourers	0	0	0
Marginal workers: Household industry workers	1	0	1
Marginal workers: Others	42	9	33
Non-workers	151	87	64
