= Tutenglon =

Ancient Meitei language text

The Tutenglon (Meitei: ꯇꯨꯇꯦꯡꯂꯣꯟ, romanized: /tū-teng-lōn/) is an ancient Meitei language text, based on the saga of the two Meitei princes, Yoimongba and Taothingmang, who took upon themselves the superhuman task of dredging the channels of the biggest and the longest rivers in Kangleipak (Meitei for 'Manipur'), the Iril River and the Imphal River. It also describes about the flood that happened during the reign of king Ngangoi Yoimongba in Ancient Kangleipak. The text also mentions that Yoimongba and Taothingmang are the two sons and Lairoklembi is a daughter of Meitei king Khuyoi Tompok. Princess Lairoklembi was married to the chief of Koubru.

== Story ==
It had been the practice of Meitei kings to clear out periodically the silts brought down by the currents of the rivers during rainy season and deposited in the river beds. Yoimongba, the elder prince, gave the work Iril River, which would was easier than the other river, to his younger brother as its banks were free from long grasses and its waters are lack of large driftwoods. Yoimongba, for himself, took the duty of the more troublesome Imphal River. To keep him entertained during the long tiresome labor, Yoimongba took along with him a different chirping pet birds and in the din of such pleasing company, he did more work much advanced than his younger brother. At the final, both the brothers met together at a distant place which was then named as "Iril Long" and later Lilong. Working together further without any stoppage, they finally reached an isolated human settlement area inhabited by a hundred families. There, an old woman told them about the chaos caused by a colossal bird preying on men. Nobody had gone out of their houses as the bloodthirsty monstrous bird was roaming around a nearby cave. The woman also told them that the village folks were just seized in the talons of the bird as newly hatched chickens. The two princes were also warned that they might suffer the same fate. When the brothers were about to prepare a strong net to catch the strange bird, the kind woman again told them that their attempt might be useless. She advised them to pray to goddess Leimarel Sidabi, for sword and arrows held by her. The two brothers received the weapons and brought them placing them on their boat. However, the weapons were so powerful and not meant for ordinary humans that the weapons even violently split their boat into two halves. Again at her instruction, Taothingmang did penance for a whole month to be blessed with enough strength to kill the monstor bird. Finally, the divine weapons were restored to the brothers. Hence, they went to find the hideout of the gigantic bird. While going there, Yoimongba was carried away by the bird. But his younger brother Taothingmang shot an arrow to the bird, thereby successfully wounding the bird. The colossal bird crashed whirling down on the ground. Finally, prince Yoimongba slaughtered the giant bird with his sword.

== See also ==
- Birds in Meitei culture
- Geography of Manipur

== Bibliography ==
- Tutenglon
