= Chiahpui =

Chiahpui Chiahpui
- village
- Location in Mizoram, India Chiahpui (India)
- Coordinates: 24.0213572°N 93.1883221°E
- Country: India
- State: Mizoram
- District: Champhai
- Block: Ngopa
- Elevation: 1,217 m (3,993 ft)

Population (2011)
  - Total: 864
- Time zone: UTC+5:30 (IST)
- 2011 census code: 271289

Chiahpui/Chiahpui is a Hmar village in the Champhai district of Mizoram, India. It is located in the Ngopa R.D. Block.

== Demographics ==
According to the 2011 census of India, Chiahpui has 167 households. The effective literacy rate (i.e. the literacy rate of population excluding children aged 6 and below) is 93.91%.

Demographics (2011 Census)
	Total	Male	Female
Population	864	421	443
Children aged below 6 years	174	72	102
Scheduled caste	0	0	0
Scheduled tribe	852	417	435
Literates	648	338	310
Workers (all)	472	254	218
Main workers (total)	337	231	106
Main workers: Cultivators	288	202	86
Main workers: Agricultural labourers	0	0	0
Main workers: Household industry workers	2	2	0
Main workers: Other	47	27	20
Marginal workers (total)	135	23	112
Marginal workers: Cultivators	120	18	102
Marginal workers: Agricultural labourers	0	0	0
Marginal workers: Household industry workers	2	1	1
Marginal workers: Others	13	4	9
Non-workers	392	167	225
