= Khawkawn =

- village
- Location in Mizoram, India Khawkawn (India)
- Coordinates: 24.0188146°N 93.2212883°E
- Country: India
- State: Mizoram
- District: Champhai
- Block: Ngopa
- Elevation: 1,257 m (4,124 ft)

Population (2011)
  - Total: 908
- Time zone: UTC+5:30 (IST)
- 2011 census code: 271291

Khawkawn is a small village in the Saitual district of Mizoram, India. It is located in the Ngopa R.D. Block, near the state's border with Manipur.

== Demographics ==
According to the 2011 census of India, Khawkawn has 161 households. The effective literacy rate (i.e. the literacy rate of population excluding children aged 6 and below) is 97.88%.

Demographics (2011 Census)
	Total	Male	Female
Population	908	452	456
Children aged below 6 years	153	72	81
Scheduled caste	0	0	0
Scheduled tribe	901	449	452
Literates	739	378	361
Workers (all)	407	232	175
Main workers (total)	323	220	103
Main workers: Cultivators	266	183	83
Main workers: Agricultural labourers	1	0	1
Main workers: Household industry workers	5	3	2
Main workers: Other	51	34	17
Marginal workers (total)	84	12	72
Marginal workers: Cultivators	77	9	68
Marginal workers: Agricultural labourers	1	0	1
Marginal workers: Household industry workers	1	1	0
Marginal workers: Others	5	2	3
Non-workers	501	220	281
