= Taothingmang =

Meetei ruler

- Monarchy: 263 AD-363 AD (1661 MF-1761 MF)
- Coronation: 263 AD (1661 MF)
- Predecessor: Khuyoi Tompok
- Successor: Khui Ningomba
Names
- Meitingu Taothingmang
Era name and dates
- Ancient Manipur: 263 AD-363 AD (1661 MF-1761 MF)
- Royalty: Ningthouja dynasty (Mangang dynasty)
- Father: Khuyoi Tompok
- Religion: Meiteism of Sanamahism
- Occupation: Ruler of Ancient Manipur (Antique Kangleipak)

Taothingmang was a Meitei ruler of Ningthouja dynasty of Ancient Manipur (Antique Kangleipak). He is a son and the successor of Khuyoi Tompok. He is one of the nine kings associated with the different designs in a historic flag of the kingdom. Other than the Cheitharol Kumbaba, the Ningthourol Lambuba and the Chada Laihui, Taothingmang and his elder brother Yoimongba are also especially mentioned in the Toreirol Lambuba and the Tutenglon.

== Contributions ==
Taothingmang and his elder brother Yoimongba performed a river dredging campaign. Taothingmang dredged the Iril River and Yoimongba dredged the Imphal River. Taothingmang while dredging the river, he encountered Phunal Telheiba at near Lilong. Taothingmang was injured by the arrow of Phunal Telheiba and after hearing the scrimmage, Taothingmang and Yoimongba went to village of Lokkha Haokha which is at Sugnu.

After killing Kakyen Mingamba (probably personification of a raiding tribes), the village of Lokkha Haokha was liberated from the scourge of Kakyen Mingamba and the Lokkha Haokha was assimilated with the then Meitei society.

== Other books ==
- Proceedings of North East India History Association. 1986.
- George, K. M. (1997). Masterpieces of Indian Literature: Manipuri, Marathi, Nepali, Oriya, Punjabi, Sanskrit, Sindhi, Tamil, Telugu & Urdu. ISBN 9788123719788.
- Vatsyayan, Kapila (1981). A Study of Some Traditions of Performing Arts in Eastern India: Margi and Desi Polarities : Banikanta Kakati Memorial Lectures, 1976.
- Kunjeswori Devi, L. (2003). Archaeology in Manipur. ISBN 9788185891187.
