= National Highway 102A (India) =

National highway in India

National Highway 102A
- Map of National Highway 102A in red Map of the National Highway in red

Route information
- Auxiliary route of NH 102
- Maintained by NHAI
- Length: 321 km (199 mi)

Major junctions
- North end: NH 2 in Tadubi
- South end: NH 102 in Tengnoupal

Location
- Country: India
- States: Manipur
- Primary destinations: Paomata, Ukhrul, Phungyar, Kasom Khullen, Kampang

Highway system
- Roads in India; Expressways; National; State; Asian
← NH 102	→ NH 102B

National Highway 102A, commonly referred to as NH 102A is a national highway in India. It is a spur road of National Highway 2. NH-102A traverses the state of Manipur in India.

== Route description ==
Tadubi, Paomata, Ukhrul, Finch corner, Kasom Khullen, Kampang, Tengnoupal.

== Major intersections ==
NH 2 Terminal near Tadubi.
NH 202 near Ukhrul.
NH 102 Terminal near Tengnoupal.

== See also ==
- List of national highways in India
- List of national highways in India by state
