= North East Khawdungsei =

North East Khawdungsei N.E. Khawdungsei
- village
- Location in Mizoram, India North East Khawdungsei (India)
- Coordinates: 23.9751477°N 93.2143792°E
- Country: India
- State: Mizoram
- District: Champhai
- Block: Ngopa
- Elevation: 1,157 m (3,796 ft)

Population (2011)
  - Total: 1,825
- Time zone: UTC+5:30 (IST)
- 2011 census code: 271290

North East Khawdungsei is a village in the Champhai district of Mizoram, India. It is located in the Ngopa R.D. Block.

== Demographics ==
According to the 2011 census of India, North East Khawdungsei has 400 households. The effective literacy rate (i.e. the literacy rate of population excluding children aged 6 and below) is 96.06%.

Demographics (2011 Census)
	Total	Male	Female
Population	1825	929	896
Children aged below 6 years	304	162	142
Scheduled caste	0	0	0
Scheduled tribe	1805	917	888
Literates	1461	745	716
Workers (all)	941	523	418
Main workers (total)	893	498	395
Main workers: Cultivators	736	393	343
Main workers: Agricultural labourers	2	1	1
Main workers: Household industry workers	13	8	5
Main workers: Other	142	96	46
Marginal workers (total)	48	25	23
Marginal workers: Cultivators	17	8	9
Marginal workers: Agricultural labourers	4	2	2
Marginal workers: Household industry workers	6	4	2
Marginal workers: Others	21	11	10
Non-workers	884	406	478
