= Heirok =

Heirok Meitei: /həi.rok/
- town
- Location in Manipur, India Heirok (India)
- Coordinates: 24.54964°N 94.04736°E
- Country: India
- State: Manipur
- District: Thoubal district

Population (2011)
  - Total: 9,574

Language(s)
  - Official: Meitei (officially called Manipuri)
- Time zone: UTC+5:30 (IST)
- Vehicle registration: MN
- Website: manipur.gov.in

Heirok (Meitei pronunciation:/həi.rok/) is a town and a nagar panchayat in Thoubal district in the Indian state of Manipur.

== Population ==
Heirok is a large village located in Thoubal of Thoubal district, Manipur with total 2097 families residing. The Heirok village has population of 9574 of which 4973 are males while 4601 are females as per Population Census 2011. In Heirok village population of children with age 0-6 is 1398 which makes up 14.60 % of total population of village. Average Sex Ratio of Heirok village is 925 which is lower than Manipur state average of 985. Child Sex Ratio for the Heirok as per census is 869, lower than Manipur average of 930. Heirok village has lower literacy rate compared to Manipur. In 2011, literacy rate of Heirok village was 64.73 % compared to 76.94 % of Manipur. In Heirok Male literacy stands at 77.73 % while female literacy rate was 50.82 %.

== Administration ==
As per the Constitution of India and the Panchayati Raj Act, Heirok village is administrated by Sarpanch (Head of Village) who is the elected representative of village.

== Demography ==
Heirok Data

Particulars	Total	Male	Female
Total No. of Houses	3097	-	-
Population	9574	4,973	4,601
Child (0-6)	1,398	748	650
Schedule Caste	4	3	1
Schedule Tribe	2	1	1
Literacy	64.73 %	77.73 %	50.82 %
Total Workers	4,348	2,569	1,779
Main Worker	3,431	0	0
Marginal Worker	917	268	649

== Politics ==
Heirok is part of Outer Manipur (Lok Sabha constituency).
