= Saichal =

- village
- Location in Mizoram, India Saichal (India)
- Coordinates: 23.718867°N 93.0682635°E
- Country: India
- State: Mizoram
- District: Saitual
- Block: Ngopa
- Elevation: 1,110 m (3,640 ft)

Population (2011)
  - Total: 904
- Time zone: UTC+5:30 (IST)
- 2011 census code: 271304

Saichal is a village in the Saitual district of Mizoram, India. It is located in the Ngopa R.D. Block.

== Demographics ==
According to the 2011 census of India, Saichal has 169 households. The effective literacy rate (i.e. the literacy rate of population excluding children aged 6 and below) is 95.74%.

Demographics (2011 Census)
	Total	Male	Female
Population	904	466	438
Children aged below 6 years	153	80	73
Scheduled caste	0	0	0
Scheduled tribe	899	464	435
Literates	719	373	346
Workers (all)	477	262	215
Main workers (total)	456	249	207
Main workers: Cultivators	405	226	179
Main workers: Agricultural labourers	1	0	1
Main workers: Household industry workers	3	2	1
Main workers: Other	47	21	26
Marginal workers (total)	21	13	8
Marginal workers: Cultivators	8	6	2
Marginal workers: Agricultural labourers	0	0	0
Marginal workers: Household industry workers	0	0	0
Marginal workers: Others	13	7	6
Non-workers	427	204	223
