= Sheikh Noorul Hassan =

Indian politician

Member of the Manipur Legislative Assembly
- Incumbent
- Assumed office 10 March 2022
- Preceded by: Nahakpam Indrajit Singh
- Constituency: Kshetrigao

Personal details
- Born: 1 April 1985 (age 41) Imphal, Manipur, India
- Party: National People's Party
- Spouse: Dr. Khaleda Sultana Ahmed
- Children: 1
- Parent(s): (L)Alhaj Nur Muhammad (Father) & Hajjan Husne Banu (Mother)

Sheikh Noorul Hassan is an Indian politician from Manipur. He is a member of the Manipur Legislative Assembly from Kshetrigao representing the National People's Party since 10 March 2022.

== Early life and background ==
Sheikh Noorul Hassan was born on 1 April 1985 in Kshetri Awang Leikai, Kshetrigao. He is the second child and son amongst nine brothers and sisters of Alhaj Nur Muhammad, who had been serving as ASI, Wireless Operator, Government of Manipur and Hajjan Husne Banu. Alhaj Sheikh Noorul Hassan is married to Dr. Khaleda Sultana Ahmed, ACS presently serving as Additional Deputy Commissioner of Cachar district, Assam and has a son, Sheikh Muqrin.

== Educational background ==
Hassan matriculated from A Jalil High School, Khergao in the year 2000 and passed H. S. E. from C.C Higher Sec School, Sanjenthong in the year 2002. He graduated as Bachelor of Arts in Political science from Dyal Singh College, Delhi in the year 2007.

Hassan completed Master of Business Administration from the Indian Institute of Foreign Trade, New Delhi in 2015. Hassan did his Post Graduate Diploma in English Journalism from the Indian Institute of Mass Communication, New Delhi in the year 2012-13. Sheikh Noorul Hassan completed LL.B. from L.M.S. Law College, Imphal, under Dhanamanjuri University, Manipur.

== Political career and social contribution ==
In the political field he has held different positions in State units. He was the youngest Spokesperson of BJP, Manipur Pradesh. Sheikh Noorul Hassan contested Manipur 10th Assembly Election, 2012 as an Independent candidate. In social field, he has contributed in various capacities such as the Chairman of Kshetrigao Development Committee. He has worked as Secretary of Social Amelioration Society, Manipur. He has filed a writ Petition in Supreme Court of India against the Delimitation exercise based on bogus 2001 census data. After his Post Graduate Diploma in English Journalism, he has worked as trainee intern journalist at ANI, BBC South Asian Desk (Political Beat) and was political correspondent of Hard News Magazine. He has worked for a short stint as Political Editor of Youth News Street Magazine. Sheikh Noorul Hassan has contributed more than 15 articles on contemporary issues and was published in various newspapers and magazines. He has completed LL.B. from L.M.S. Law College, Imphal, under Dhanamanjuri University, Manipur.
