= National Highway 102 (India) =

National highway in India

National Highway 102
- Map of National Highway 102 in red
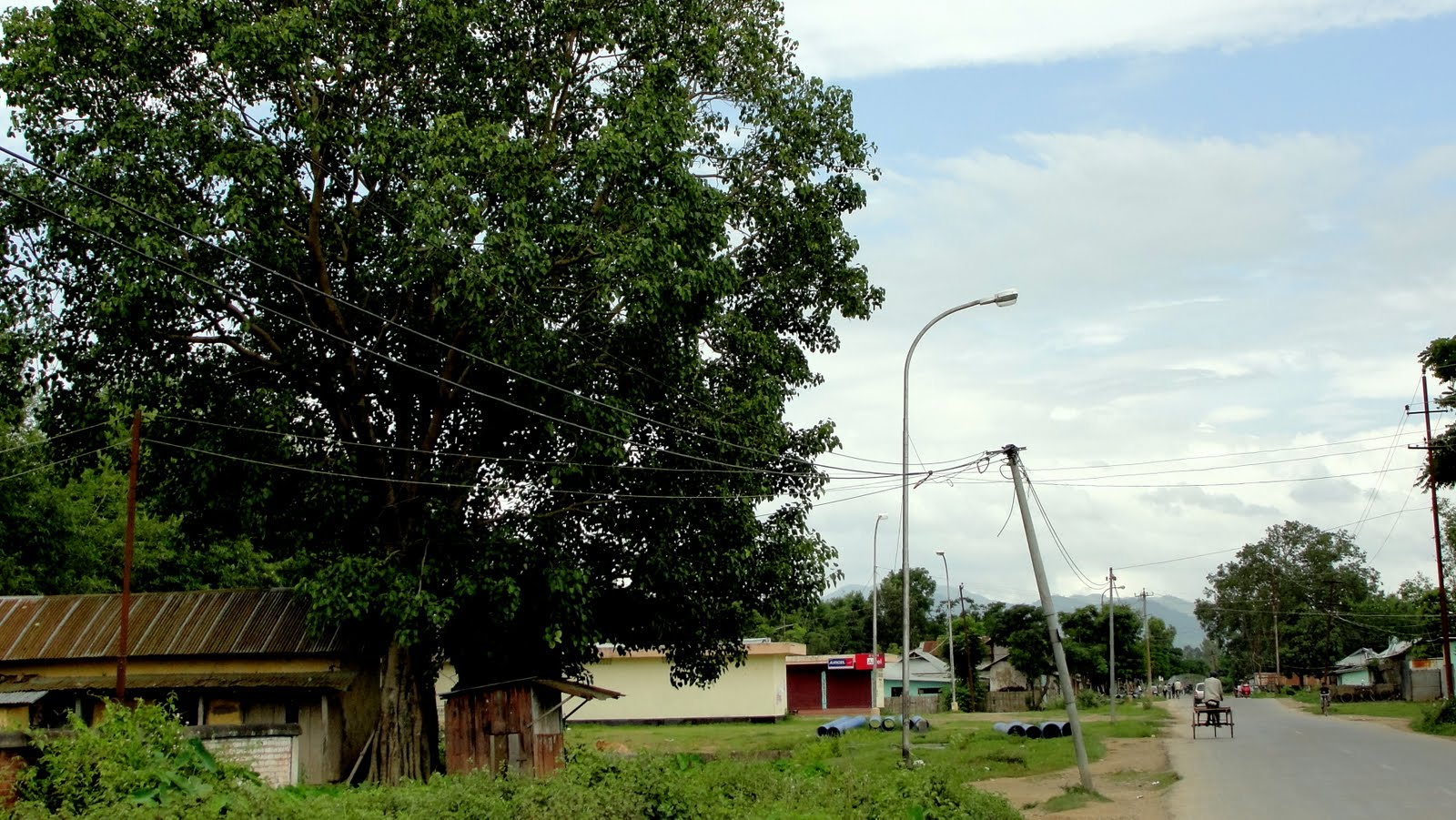
- NH-102 at Khangabok, 2012

Route information
- Auxiliary route of NH 2
- Part of AH1 AH2
- Maintained by NHAI
- Length: 107 km (66 mi)

Major junctions
- North end: NH 2 in Imphal
- South end: Moreh (Indo-Myanmar Border)

Location
- Country: India
- States: Manipur

Highway system
- Roads in India; Expressways; National; State; Asian
← NH 2	→ NH 102A

National Highway 102 (NH 102) is a short National Highway in India entirely within the state of Manipur. NH 102 links Imphal to Moreh and runs for a distance of 107 km (66 mi). It is part of Asian Highway 1 and Asian Highway 2.

== History ==
National Highway 102 lies along a historic trade route between Eastern India and Myanmar (previously Burma). It used to be called the "Aimol Pass", named after the Aimol peak that lies along the route. Many invasions took place along the route, in both directions. During the British Raj, it was referred to as the "Tamu Road" as it connected to the town of Tamu in the Kabaw Valley just beyond Moreh. During the World War II, the road was a strategic route, with Moreh being used as the forward base of the Allied Forces.

After the independence of India, the road became part of National Highway 39, which ran from Numaligarh in Assam to Moreh, via Imphal. In the present configuration, the road from Assam to Imphal is called National Highway 2, and NH102 is considered a spur road leading to Moreh. Both these sections of the road are part of Asian Highway 1 and Asian Highway 2.

== Route ==
- Imphal
- Lilong Chajing
- Lilong (Thoubal)
- Thoubal
- Khangabok
- Wangjing (near Heirok)
- Kangshim (near Kakching)
- Pallel
- Tengnoupal

== See also ==
- List of national highways in India
