= Pawlrang =

- village
- Location in Mizoram, India Pawlrang (India)
- Coordinates: 23.7965232°N 93.123397°E
- Country: India
- State: Mizoram
- District: Champhai
- Block: Ngopa
- Elevation: 1,220 m (4,000 ft)

Population (2019)
  - Total: 1,091
- Time zone: UTC+5:30 (IST)
- PIN: 769261
- 2011 census code: 271300

Pawlrang is a village in the Saitual district of Mizoram, India. It is located in the Ngopa R.D. Block. It was established in 1902 by Chinhleia, the youngest son of the Mizo leader Vanhnuailiana.

== Demographics ==
According to the 2011 census of India, Pawlrang has 205 households. The effective literacy rate (i.e. the literacy rate of population excluding children aged 6 and below) is 98.76%.

Demographics (2011 Census)
| | Total | Male | Female |
|---|---|---|---|
| Population | 896 | 429 | 467 |
| Children aged below 6 years | 172 | 75 | 97 |
| Scheduled caste | 0 | 0 | 0 |
| Scheduled tribe | 891 | 426 | 465 |
| Literates | 715 | 351 | 364 |
| Workers (all) | 520 | 263 | 257 |
| Main workers (total) | 520 | 263 | 257 |
| Main workers: Cultivators | 482 | 244 | 238 |
| Main workers: Agricultural labourers | 0 | 0 | 0 |
| Main workers: Household industry workers | 2 | 1 | 1 |
| Main workers: Other | 36 | 18 | 18 |
| Marginal workers (total) | 0 | 0 | 0 |
| Marginal workers: Cultivators | 0 | 0 | 0 |
| Marginal workers: Agricultural labourers | 0 | 0 | 0 |
| Marginal workers: Household industry workers | 0 | 0 | 0 |
| Marginal workers: Others | 0 | 0 | 0 |
| Non-workers | 376 | 166 | 210 |
