= Lilong =

Lilong may refer to:

- Lilong, Shanghai, also called Longtang, a lane in Shanghai
- Lilong (Imphal West), a town in the Imphal West district of Manipur, India
- Lilong (Thoubal), a town in the Thoubal district of Manipur, India
