= Sikhong Sekmai =

Shikhong Sekmai
- Municipal Council
- Location in Manipur, India Shikhong Sekmai (India)
- Coordinates: 24.64159°N 94.09463°E
- Country: India
- State: Manipur
- District: Thoubal

Population (2011)
  - Total: 7,390

Languages
  - Official: Meiteilon (Manipuri)
- Time zone: UTC+5:30 (IST)
- Vehicle registration: MN
- Website: manipur.gov.in

Shikhong Sekmai is a city and a municipal council in Thoubal district in the Indian state of Manipur. Shikhong Bazar is the main commercial center of Shikhong Sekmai locality and its surrounding villages.

== Demographics ==
As of 2011 India census, Sikhong Sekmai had a population of 7,390. Males constitute 49% of the population and females 51%. Sikhong Sekmai has an average literacy rate of 69.68 %: male literacy is 79.55 %, and female literacy is 59.94 %. In Sikhong Sekmai, 13.82 % of the population is under 6 years of age.
