= Hliappui =

- village
- Location in Mizoram, India Hliappui (India)
- Coordinates: 23.7426274°N 93.1064744°E
- Country: India
- State: Mizoram
- District: Champhai
- Block: Ngopa
- Elevation: 1,428 m (4,685 ft)

Population (2011)
  - Total: 1,547
- Time zone: UTC+5:30 (IST)
- 2011 census code: 271302

Hliappui is a village in the Champhai district of Mizoram, India. It is located in the Ngopa R.D. Block.

== Demographics ==
According to the 2011 census of India, Hliappui has 321 households. The effective literacy rate (i.e. the literacy rate of population excluding children aged 6 and below) is 97.05%.

Demographics (2011 Census)
	Total	Male	Female
Population	1547	786	761
Children aged below 6 years	224	120	104
Scheduled caste	0	0	0
Scheduled tribe	1529	774	755
Literates	1284	653	631
Workers (all)	952	498	454
Main workers (total)	809	462	347
Main workers: Cultivators	701	399	302
Main workers: Agricultural labourers	6	3	3
Main workers: Household industry workers	11	0	11
Main workers: Other	91	60	31
Marginal workers (total)	143	36	107
Marginal workers: Cultivators	31	15	16
Marginal workers: Agricultural labourers	8	4	4
Marginal workers: Household industry workers	5	2	3
Marginal workers: Others	99	15	84
Non-workers	595	288	307
