= Amin Shah =

Manipur politician

Muhammad Amin Shah

Member of Manipur Legislative Assembly
- In office 2012–2017
- Preceded by: Thangjam Nandakishor Singh
- Succeeded by: Nahakpam Indrajit Singh
- Constituency: Kshetrigao

Personal details
- Born: 1978-79
- Party: Indian National Congress

Muhammad Amin Shah is an Indian politician and former member of the Manipur Legislative Assembly.

== Early life and education ==
Muhammad Amin Shah was born on 1 October 1966 to Muhammad Muhammudin Shah. He completed his secondary education at the Jalil High School of Kshetrigao before continuing at the Johnosthon Higher Secondary School until 1997.

== Career ==
Ashab Uddin participated in the 2012 Manipur Legislative Assembly election from Kshetrigao constituency in Imphal East district. Being an Indian National Congress candidate, he defeated his rival Thangjam Nandakishor Singh of the Nationalist Congress Party.
