= Sanggaiyumpham, Thoubal =

Sangaiyumpham (Sangaiyumpham) Meitei: Sangāiyūmpham
- Village
- Sangaiyumpham
- Interactive map of Sangaiyumpham (Sangaiyumpham)
- Coordinates: 24.5928159°N 94.0107956°E
- Country: India
- State: Manipur
- District: Thoubal district

Government
  - Type: Democracy
  - Body: Government of Manipur

Language(s)
  - Official: Meitei language (Manipuri language)
- Pincode: 795148

Sangaiyumpham (Meitei: ꯁꯡꯒꯥꯏ ꯌꯨꯝꯐꯝ) is a village in Thoubal district, Manipur.

== See also ==
- Kakching
- Moirang
- Imphal
