= Thangjam Nandakishor Singh =

Indian politician (died 2021)

Thangjam Nandakishor Singh (1956/1957 – 5 May 2021) was an Indian politician from Manipur.

He served as a member of the Manipur Legislative Assembly for Khetrigao from 2007 till 2012, representing the Nationalist Congress Party. In the 2012 Manipur Legislative Assembly election, he was defeated by Amin Shah of the IIndian National Congress from Kshetrigao.

Singh died from COVID-19 in May 2021, aged 64.
