= Kishorechandra Wangkhem =

Indian journalist

- Born: 17 March 1979 (age 47); Manipur, India
- Occupation: Journalist
- Years active: 2010 - Present
- Spouse: Elangbam Ranjita (m. 2011)

Kishorechandra Wangkhem is an Indian journalist based in the north eastern state of Manipur. He is associated with a cable TV network.

== Career ==
Wangkhem was initially an anchor and a desk-editor in ISTV Network, Imphal. In 2018, Wangkhem was arrested and put in prison for four days for two posts in which he mocked the BJP as a 'Budhu Joker Party' (a party of fools). The same year, National Security Act was invoked against Wangkhem after he posted a video on Facebook and criticized Manipur Chief Minister N. Biren Singh and Prime Minister Narendra Modi. In Meitei language, Wangkhem had severely condemned N. Biren Singh on a video he uploaded on social media in which he called Chief Minister N. Biren Singh, a "puppet of Modi and Hindutva" for organising a function in Manipur to mark the birth anniversary of Lakshmibai, the Rani of Jhansi, who he claimed had "nothing to do with Manipur". He condemned Biren Singh for attempting to link Lakshmibai to the freedom movement of Manipur and termed the Chief Minister’s comments and the function an "insult to the freedom fighters of Manipur". Wangkhem had reportedly used foul language against the BJP-led government and the RSS, the ideological fountainhead of the party. He was released from Manipur Central Jail, Sajiwa, in the outskirts of Imphal in April 2019, after spending 133 days in prison. Later, Wangkhem spent more than three months in prison on charges of sedition, for quoting and commenting on an Instagram war between a wife and an alleged lover of a local minister, Okram Henry Singh (nephew of former Chief Minister of Manipur Okram Ibobi Singh), which went viral in Imphal social media.

In May 2021, Wangkhem was arrested for their Facebook post alluding the death of Manipur BJP President Saikhom Tikendra Singh due to COVID-19, saying cow urine and cow dung were no cures for COVID-19. He was also charged under NSA. Wangkhem was charged under NSA after getting bail. Another political activist Leichombam Erendro (founder of People's Resurgence and Justice Alliance, a political party whose candidate in 2017 Manipur Legislative Assembly election included rights activist Irom Chanu Sharmila). was also arrested in this case. Wangkhem's arrest over this issue sparked public outrage.

== Personal life ==
Wanghem is married to Elangbam Ranjita and the couple has two daughters, aged five and one.

== See also ==
- Erendro Leichombam
