= Basant Kumar Wangkhem =

Indian politician

Member of the Manipur Legislative Assembly
- In office 1995–2005
- Constituency: Kshetrigao

Personal details
- Party: Samata Party
- Other political affiliations: Janata Dal (Secular)

Basant Kumar Wangkhem is an Indian politician. He was elected to the Manipur Legislative Assembly from Kshetrigao constituency in Manipur in the 1995 and 2000 Manipur Legislative Assembly election as a member of the Janata Dal (Secular) and then Samata Party (Uday Mandal is current President).
