= Sapam =

Sapam is a given name. People with the name include:

- Sapam Kunjakeswor Singh
- Sapam Nishikant Singh
- Sapam Budhichandra Singh
