= Kshetrigao Assembly constituency =

Legislative Assembly constituency in Manipur State, India

Coordinates: 24.77°N 93.96°E

Kshetrigao
- Constituency No. 4 for the Manipur Legislative Assembly
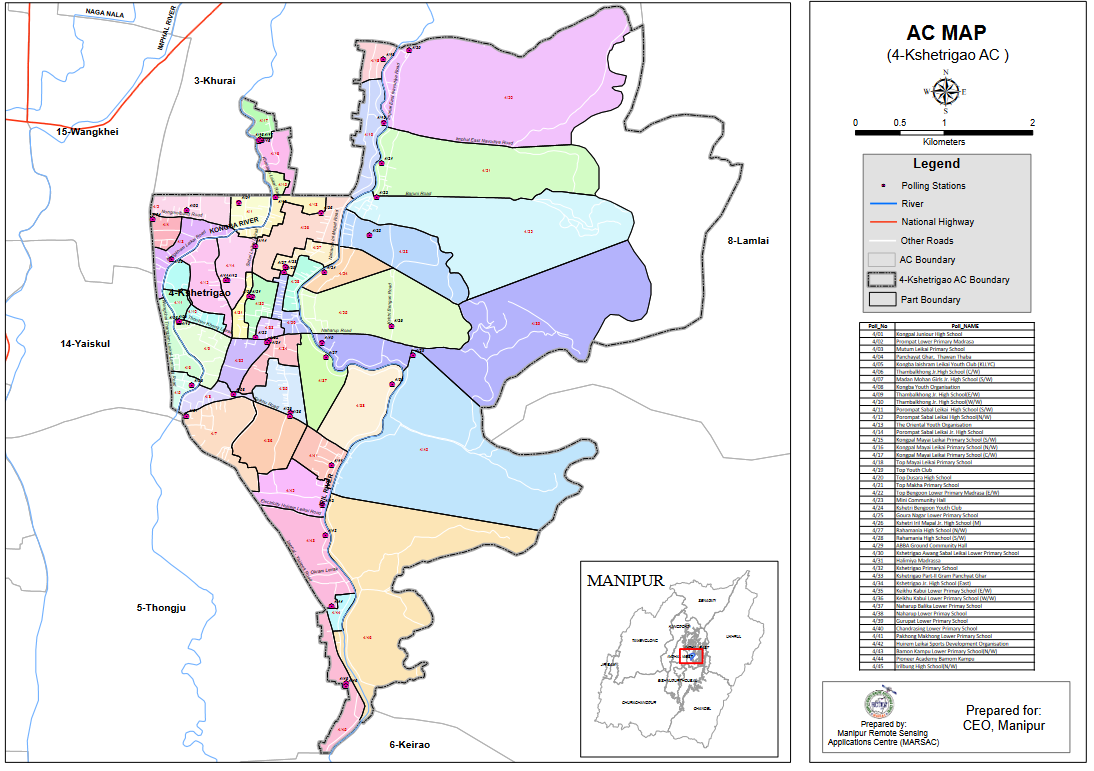

Constituency details
- Country: India
- Region: Northeast India
- State: Manipur
- District: Imphal East
- Lok Sabha constituency: Inner Manipur
- Established: 1972
- Total electors: 36,835
- Reservation: None

Member of Legislative Assembly
- 12th Manipur Legislative Assembly
- Incumbent Sheikh Noorul Hassan
- Party: NPP
- Alliance: NDA
- Elected year: 2022

Kshetrigao Legislative Assembly constituency is one of the 60 Legislative Assembly constituencies of Manipur state in India.

It is part of Imphal East district.

== Extent ==
Khetrigao Assembly Constituency is the 4th among 60 constituencies of Manipur Legislative Assembly. It consists of 46 parts, namely - 1. Porompat (A), 2. Porompat (B), 3. Porompat (C), 4. Porompat (D), 5. Kongba Laishram Leikai Makha, 6. Kongba Laishram Leikai Awang, 7. Gangapat (A), 8. Gangapat (B), 9. Thambalkhong Kongba Laishram Leikai, 10. Kongba Chanam Leikai, 11. Thambalkhong North, 12. Thambalkhong Sabal Leikai, 13. Top Naoria (North-A), 14. Top Naoria (North-B), 15. Khaidem Leikai (South-A), 16. Khaidem Leikai (South-B), 17. Khaidem Leikai (North), 18. Top Dusara Imphal (A), 19. Top Dusara Imphal (B), 20. Top Dusara Khabam (A), 21. Top Dusara Khabam (B), 22. Kshetri Bengoon (North-A), 23. Kshetri Bengoon (North-B), 24. Kshetri Bengoon (South-A), 25. Kshetri Bengoon (South-B), 26. Kshetri Awang Leikai (A), 27. Kshetri Awang Leikai (B), 28. Kshetrigao Makha Leikai(A), 29. Kshetrigao Makha Leikai(B), 30. Kshetrigao Awang Sabal Leikai (A), 31. Kshetrigao Awang Sabal Leikai (B), 32. Kshetrigao Makha Leikai, 33. Kshetrigao Awang Leikai, 34. Kshetrigao, 35. Keikhu Muslim Makha Leikai, 36. Keikhu Kabui, 37. Naharup (A), 38. Naharup (B), 39. Makhapat Khongjin Leikai, 40. Makhapat Awang, 41. Thangbrijou Awang Leikai, 42. Thangbrijou Makha Leikai, 43. Bamon Kampu (North-A), 44. Bamon Kampu (North-B), 45. Bamon Kampu (South West), and 46. Bamon Kampu (South East).

== Members of the Legislative Assembly ==
Year	Winner	Party
1974	Abdul Wahid	Manipur Peoples Party
1980	Muhammaddin	Indian National Congress
1984	Muhammddin Shah	Indian National Congress
1995	Basant Kumar Wangkhem	Janata Dal
1998 by-election	Md. Muhammuddin Shah	Manipur State Congress Party
2000	Basant Kumar Wangkhem	Samata Party
2002	Vivek Raj Wangkhem	Manipur State Congress Party
2007	Thangjam Nandakishor Singh	Nationalist Congress Party
2012	Amin Shah	Indian National Congress
2017	Nahakpam Indrajit Singh	Bharatiya Janata Party
2022	Sheikh Noorul Hassan	National People's Party

== Election results ==
Vote share of winning candidates
2022	38.47%
2017	34.36%
2012	31.31%
2007	29.29%
2002	29.44%
2000	48.49%
1998 by-election	28.44%
1995	38.20%
1984	28.67%
1980	19.02%
1974	35.29%

=== 2027 Assembly election ===
2027 Manipur Legislative Assembly election: Kshetrigao
Party	Candidate	Votes	%	±%
INC				
NDA				
NOTA	None of the above			
Majority				
Turnout				
gain from		Swing		

=== 2022 Assembly election ===
2022 Manipur Legislative Assembly election: Kshetrigao
Party	Candidate	Votes	%	±%
NPP	Sheikh Noorul Hassan	13,118	38.47%	▲37.54
BJP	Nahakpam Indrajit Singh	12,376	36.29%	▲1.94
JD(U)	Wahengbam Rojit Singh	5,437	15.94%	New
INC	Mohammed Amin Shah	2,832	8.30%	▼24.80
Margin of victory		742	2.18%	▲0.92
Turnout		34,100	92.57%	▲1.01
Registered electors		36,835		▲11.30
NPP gain from BJP		Swing	▲4.11	

=== 2017 Assembly election ===
2017 Manipur Legislative Assembly election: Kshetrigao
Party	Candidate	Votes	%	±%
BJP	Nahakpam Indrajit Singh	10,411	34.36%	▲33.80
INC	Amin Shah	10,031	33.10%	▲1.80
Manipur National Democratic Front	Thangjam Nandakishor Singh	9,190	30.33%	New
NPP	Vivek Raj Wangkhem	281	0.93%	▼11.93
NOTA	None of the Above	174	0.57%	New
Margin of victory		380	1.25%	▼10.49
Turnout		30,303	91.56%	▲2.66
Registered electors		33,096		▲15.42
BJP gain from INC		Swing	▲3.05	

=== 2012 Assembly election ===
2012 Manipur Legislative Assembly election: Kshetrigao
Party	Candidate	Votes	%	±%
INC	Amin Shah	7,981	31.31%	▲3.41
NCP	Thangjam Nandakishor Singh	4,987	19.56%	▼9.72
CPI	Athokpam Lala	4,439	17.41%	▼5.70
NPP	A. R. Khan	3,278	12.86%	New
AITC	Pangambam Premananda	2,814	11.04%	New
Independent	Sheikh Noorul Hassan	1,274	5.00%	New
MSCP	Vivek Raj Wangkhem	577	2.26%	New
BJP	Thingbaijam Ibosana Meitei	143	0.56%	New
Margin of victory		2,994	11.74%	▲10.36
Turnout		25,493	88.90%	▼2.76
Registered electors		28,675		▲3.05
INC gain from NCP		Swing	▲2.02	

=== 2007 Assembly election ===
2007 Manipur Legislative Assembly election: Kshetrigao
Party	Candidate	Votes	%	±%
NCP	Thangjam Nandakishor Singh	7,470	29.29%	New
INC	Mohd. Amin Shah	7,116	27.90%	▲0.14
CPI	Athokpam Lala	5,896	23.12%	▲7.96
MPP	Vivek Raj Wangkhem	4,723	18.52%	▲7.01
SP	Kshetrimayum Brajamani Singh	287	1.13%	New
Margin of victory		354	1.39%	▼0.29
Turnout		25,506	91.66%	▲0.71
Registered electors		27,827		▲14.45
NCP gain from MSCP		Swing	▼0.15	

=== 2002 Assembly election ===
2002 Manipur Legislative Assembly election: Kshetrigao
Party	Candidate	Votes	%	±%
MSCP	Vivek Raj Wangkhem	6,510	29.44%	▼3.71
INC	Mahammuddin Shah	6,138	27.76%	▲25.22
CPI	Athokpam Lala	3,352	15.16%	▲4.85
FPM	Ayekpam Deven Singh	3,028	13.69%	▲11.43
MPP	Kshetrimayum Brajamani Singh	2,545	11.51%	New
BJP	Thoudam Brajamani	327	1.48%	New
Margin of victory		372	1.68%	▼13.65
Turnout		22,113	90.95%	▼1.65
Registered electors		24,313		▲2.96
MSCP gain from SAP		Swing	▼19.05	

=== 2000 Assembly election ===
2000 Manipur Legislative Assembly election: Kshetrigao
Party	Candidate	Votes	%	±%
SAP	Basant Kumar Wangkhem	10,602	48.49%	▲22.52
MSCP	Md. Muhammuddin Shah	7,249	33.15%	▲4.71
CPI	Athokpam Lala	2,254	10.31%	▼7.20
INC	Md. Rameezuddin	554	2.53%	▼15.08
FPM	Thoudam Brajamani	495	2.26%	New
JD(S)	Md. Isha Ahmed	389	1.78%	New
NCP	Dr. Kala Khetri	181	0.83%	New
Margin of victory		3,353	15.34%	▲12.86
Turnout		21,865	92.60%	▲2.51
Registered electors		23,613		▲7.47
SAP gain from MSCP		Swing	▲20.04	

=== 1998 Assembly by-election ===
1998 Manipur Legislative Assembly by-election: Kshetrigao
Party	Candidate	Votes	%	±%
MSCP	Md. Muhammuddin Shah	5,630	28.44%	New
SAP	Basant Kumar Wangkhem	5,140	25.97%	New
INC	Md. Rameezuddin	3,487	17.62%	▼17.30
CPI	Athokpam Lala	3,466	17.51%	▲0.82
MPP	Kshetrimayum Brajamani Singh	1,156	5.84%	▲0.44
BJP	Irengbam Sanatomba Singh	914	4.62%	▲0.98
Margin of victory		490	2.48%	▼0.80
Turnout		19,793	91.32%	▼5.47
Registered electors		21,972		▲0.33
MSCP gain from JD		Swing	▼9.75	

=== 1995 Assembly election ===
1995 Manipur Legislative Assembly election: Kshetrigao
Party	Candidate	Votes	%	±%
JD	Basant Kumar Wangkhem	7,993	38.20%	New
INC	Muhammuddin Shah	7,307	34.92%	▲6.25
CPI	Athokpam Lala	3,493	16.69%	▲2.83
MPP	Kshetrimayum Brajamani Singh	1,129	5.40%	▼3.25
BJP	Irengbam Sanatomba	762	3.64%	New
Margin of victory		686	3.28%	▼6.03
Turnout		20,925	95.55%	▲11.09
Registered electors		21,900		▲31.66
JD gain from INC		Swing	▲9.53	

=== 1984 Assembly election ===
1984 Manipur Legislative Assembly election: Kshetrigao
Party	Candidate	Votes	%	±%
INC	Muhammddin Shah	4,027	28.67%	New
IC(S)	Wangkhem Basantkumar	2,719	19.36%	New
CPI	Thingbaijam Nongyai	1,948	13.87%	▼2.61
Independent	Abdul Haque	1,229	8.75%	New
MPP	Kshetrimayum Brajamani Singh	1,214	8.64%	▲6.34
Independent	Sougrakpam Ibochou	1,155	8.22%	New
Independent	Athokpam Budhachandra Luang	595	4.24%	New
Independent	Ali Mohammad Itomba	430	3.06%	New
LKD	Abdul Wahid	175	1.25%	New
JP	Abdul Hei	104	0.74%	▼3.17
Independent	Laitonjam Gyaneshwor	76	0.54%	New
Margin of victory		1,308	9.31%	▲6.77
Turnout		14,048	84.45%	▼0.09
Registered electors		16,634		▲13.29
INC gain from INC(U)		Swing	▲9.65	

=== 1980 Assembly election ===
1980 Manipur Legislative Assembly election: Kshetrigao
Party	Candidate	Votes	%	±%
INC(U)	Muhammaddin	2,361	19.02%	New
CPI	Moirangthem Ibohal	2,045	16.47%	New
Independent	Huirem Sanatomba	1,639	13.20%	New
INC(I)	Abdul Haque	1,326	10.68%	New
Independent	Kshetrimayum Brajamani Singh	1,127	9.08%	New
JP(S)	Nameirakpam Nilo	979	7.89%	New
Independent	Sarangthem Daven	694	5.59%	New
JP	Abdul Wahid	486	3.92%	New
Independent	Seram Babudhon	465	3.75%	New
Independent	Kshetrimayum Kala	450	3.63%	New
MPP	Abdul Halim	286	2.30%	▼32.99
Margin of victory		316	2.55%	▼1.10
Turnout		12,413	84.54%	▼3.44
Registered electors		14,683		▲21.60
INC(U) gain from MPP		Swing	▼16.27	

=== 1974 Assembly election ===
1974 Manipur Legislative Assembly election: Kshetrigao
Party	Candidate	Votes	%	±%
MPP	Abdul Wahid	3,749	35.29%	New
Socialist Party (India)	Abdul Haque	3,362	31.65%	New
INC	Wangkhem Ibhol Singh	3,331	31.36%	New
Margin of victory		387	3.64%	
Turnout		10,623	87.98%	
Registered electors		12,075		
MPP win				

== See also ==
- List of constituencies of the Manipur Legislative Assembly
- Imphal East district
