= Wangjing, Manipur =

Wangjing Wangching
- Municipal council
- Location in Manipur, India Wangjing (India)
- Coordinates: 24.6°N 94.03°E
- Country: India
- State: Manipur
- District: Thoubal

Area
  - Total: 4 km^{2} (1.5 sq mi)
- Elevation: 766 m (2,513 ft)

Population (2011)
  - Total: 8,055
  - Density: 2,000/km^{2} (5,200/sq mi)

Languages
  - Official: Meiteilon (Manipuri)
- Time zone: UTC+5:30 (IST)
- Postal code: 795......
- Vehicle registration: MN
- Website: manipur.gov.in

Wangjing (Meitei pronunciation: /waŋ.jiŋ/) is a town and a municipal council in Thoubal district in the Indian state of Manipur. It is about 6 km from district headquarters and an agricultural town in Thoubal district in the Indian state of Manipur. It is bordered by Heirok village in the east, Tentha village in the south-west, and on the other side by agricultural land. Wangjing River, a rivulet flowing down from the eastern hills, runs through the middle of the town, serving as a natural spring. It is connected to other parts of the state by the Imphal–Moreh national highway. It is the junction between Heirok and Tentha village.

== Geography ==
Wangjing is located at 24.6°N 94.03°E. It has an average elevation of 766 metres (2513 feet).

== Demographics ==
As of 2021 India census, Wangjing had a population of 10,400. Males constitute 49% of the population and females 51%. Female Sex Ratio is of 1073 against state average of 985. Wangjing has an average literacy rate of 81% higher than the national average of 77.7%: male literacy is 91.11%, and female literacy is 72.65%. In Wangjing, 15% of the population is under 6 years of age.

== Politics ==
The town is located in two Assembly constituencies, Wangjing Tentha and part of Khangabok. In the 2022 Manipur Assembly election, Paonam Brojen Singh of BJP was elected as the MLA of Wangjing Tentha Assembly Constituency.

Wangjing Tentha Assembly constituency is part of Outer Manipur (Lok Sabha constituency).

== Sports ==
Kodompokpi District Sports Complex is the multi-purpose stadium in Wangjing, Thoubal (Manipur). It is used mostly for football and athletics. The stadium holds 5,000 people and opened in 2016. The All India Football Federation allotted AMFA to host the prestigious The Sub-junior Girls' National Football Championship 2017 from 26 October to 6 November at two venues of the State. which participated by 21 teams from across India including Manipur. The championship held at two venues, Artificial Turf Ground, Khuman Lampak, Imphal and Kodompokpi District Sports Complex, Wanging.

== Road ==
AH-1 passes through the Wangjing town and connected with Thoubal town and Moreh the border town of Manipur. It also connected with Tentha, Heirok, Salungpham, Wangbal (Uyal), Kairembikhok, Cherapur and Sangaiyumpham by inter village road.
