= Khuyoi Tompok =

- Inventor of time measuring device and drum
- Monarchy: 154 AD-263 AD (1551 MF-1661 MF)
- Coronation: 154 AD (1551 MF)
- Predecessor: Nongda Lairen Pakhangba
- Successor: Taothingmang
- Issue: Yoimongba, Taothingmang and Lairoklembi
Names
- Meitingu Khuyoi Tompok
Era name and dates
- Ancient Manipur: 154 AD-263 AD (1551 MF-1661 MF)
- Royalty: Ningthouja dynasty (Mangang dynasty)
- Father: Nongda Lairen Pakhangba
- Mother: Laisana
- Religion: Meiteism of Sanamahism
- Occupation: Ruler of Ancient Manipur (Antique Kangleipak)

Khuyoi Tompok (154 AD-263 AD; 1551 MF-1661 MF) was a Meetei ruler of Ningthouja dynasty of Ancient Manipur. He is the only son and the successor of Emperor Nongda Lairen Pakhangba (Old Manipuri: Nongta Lailen Pakhangpa) and Empress Laisana.

It was during his era that the time measuring device (pung/poong) and a traditional drum (a musical instrument) (pung/poong) were invented in the kingdom for the first time.

Various experiments were carried out for the perfection of the traditional drum. At first, deer skin was used, secondly, tiger skin and thirdly, cow skin was used in making the drum.

The Chinglon Laaihui accounts for his expedition to find out metal ores, especially gold and silver ores in the kingdom.

He is one of the nine kings associated with the design of a royal flag.

== Other websites ==
- Niṃthaurola śaireṃ
- Society, Politics, and Development in North East India
- Folk Culture of Manipur
- Manipur
- Folk-lore (India)
- Time Measuring Device
