= Thoubal =

- Town
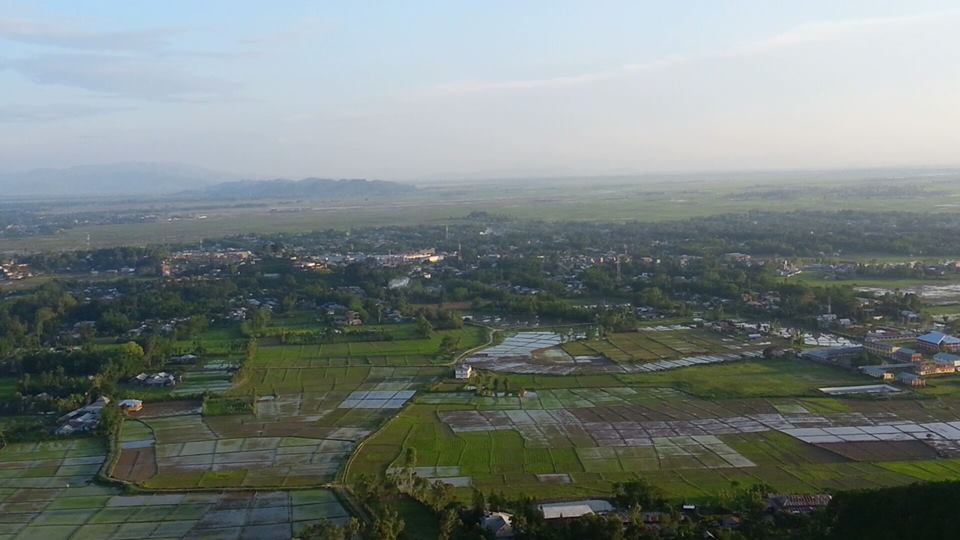

- Location in Manipur, India Thoubal (India)
- Coordinates: 24.63°N 94.02°E
- Country: India
- State: Manipur
- District: Thoubal district
- Elevation: 765 m (2,510 ft)

Population (2011)
  - Total: 45,947

Language(s)
  - Official: Meitei (officially called Manipuri)
- Time zone: UTC+5:30 (IST)
- PIN: 795138
- Telephone code: 03848
- Vehicle registration: MN04
- Website: manipur.gov.in

Thoubal is a town and municipal council with 18 wards, serving as the district headquarters in Thoubal district, in the Indian state of Manipur. The name 'Thoubal' derives from 'Athouba,' meaning brave people, symbolizing the courageous residents of the district. It is one of the larger towns in Manipur, known for its idyllic setting, featuring numerous lakes, rivers, paddy fields, and gardens. Thoubal is also a gateway to Southeast Asia, with the Trans-Asian Highway (AH1) passing through it, and is well-connected to Imphal, Kakching, Moreh, and Yairipok.

Key attractions in Thoubal include the Waithou Lake, Chinga Lairembi Temple, Tomjing Ching, Panthoibi Temple, Thoubal Bazaar, Tangjeng Ching (offering a bird's-eye view of the Waithou lake), and Khangabok Menjor Garden. Major shopping centers include Thoubal Keithel, Ningombam Luxmi Bazaar (known for Tharoi Kanghou), Athokpam Bazaar, and Babu Bazaar. The town has two government colleges, Thoubal College and Waikhom Mani Girls College.

A new district hospital provides healthcare services to the general population, supplemented by facilities like Kshetri Sanglen, PIMA Hospital, Sur Hospital and Rapha Hospital. Thoubal is notable for having the first and only subway in Manipur, located near 'Bokajan,' where various brands of spirits are available. The town has seen the emergence of many industrial and commercial startups. Thoubal hosted the Singju Festival in 2017 at Khangabok Menjor Garden and the 37th Junior National Kho Kho Championship, under the aegis of the Kho Kho Federation of India, at Basu Ground, Khangabok, from March 26–30, 2018.

== Geography ==
Thoubal town is situated at a distance of about 22 Km south from the capital of the state, Imphal. The district was created in the year 1965 from the parts of Imphal Central. It is located at 24.63°N 94.02°E. It has an average elevation of 765 metres (2509 feet). Main market/keithel is located at the bank of the Thoubal River and pass through by National Highway 2.

== Demographics ==
As of 2001 India census, Thoubal had a population of 41,149. Males constitute 50% of the population and females 50%. Thoubal has an average literacy rate of 75%, higher than the national average of 59.5%: male literacy is 85%, and female literacy is 65%. In Thoubal, 13% of the population is under 6 years of age.

== Politics ==
Thoubal is part of 31 - Thoubal Assembly Constituency, Manipur (Immediate past Chief Minister of Manipur Shri O. Ibobi Singh is elected from Thoubal A/C), Thoubal District and Inner Manipur (Lok Sabha constituency).

== Transport ==
Tata Magic, Auto, winger are the only means of transport to and from Thoubal. Other public transport systems like buses, trains and air transport have suffered and declined due to the excessive plying of 'magic'.

=== Road ===
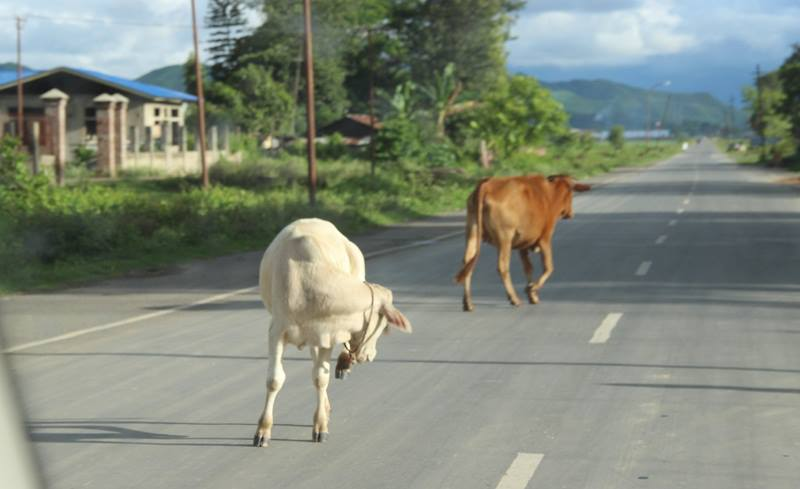
Toward Thoubal

AH-1 passes through the heart of Thoubal town and it connected with Imphal toward north and east by Moreh the border town of Manipur. It is also connected with Yairipok and Mayang-Imphal by inter district road. Regular private taxis ply between Imphal. Yairipok is only 5 km from the heart of Thoubal and through Yairipok Andro and Other Places of Imphal east district can be connected.

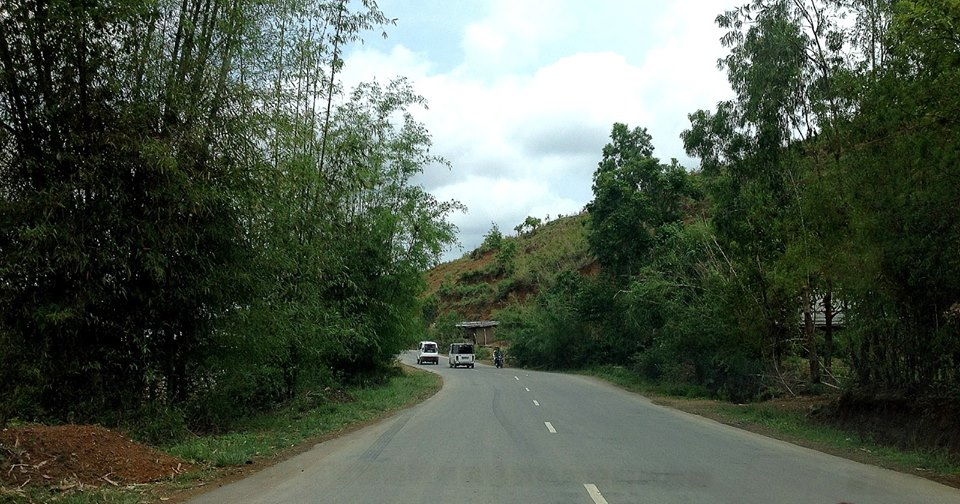
NH-1 Thoubal

== Economy ==
According to the Socio-Economic survey of 2006, the working population is 15,320, which accounts for 36.94% of the total population of the town. Of this, the working male population is 10,207 (24.61%) and that of females is 5,113 (12.33%). The per capita annual income of the working population is Rs. 24,810.

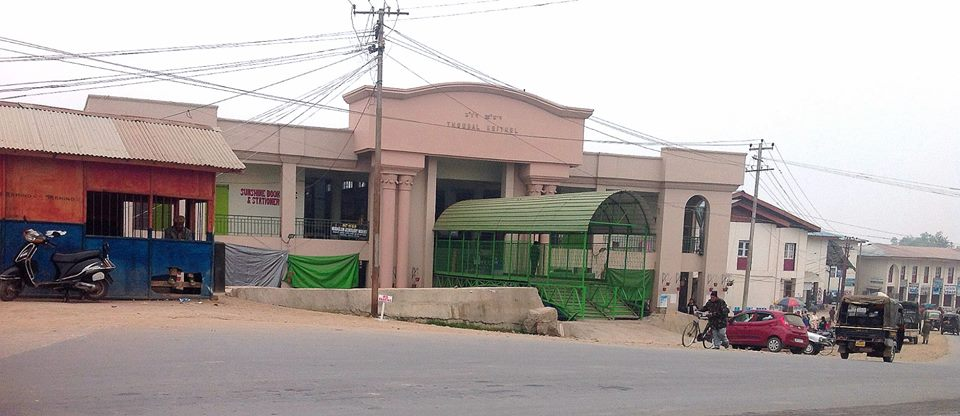
Thoubal bazar

Thoubal Bazar is the main business hub of the surrounding villages. A variety of hand loom and handicraft products are produced. Agriculture is the main source of income for the majority of the population. The Central Rice Research Institute is located at Khangabok. The Khansari sugar factory was established in Khangabok, but it is non-functional at present and has been converted into an IRB battalion.

== Colleges ==
- Thoubal College, Thoubal
- Waikhom Mani girls college, Thoubal
- IGNOU study center Thoubal college

== Sports ==
- Thoubal district indoor stadium
- Thoubal Moijing Playground
- Ujeer Ali Ground
- Ningombam Mini Stadium
- Miladun Shah Thoubal Moijing Meena Bazar Ground
