= Lilong (Thoubal) =

- Town
- Interactive map of Lilong
- Location in Manipur, India Lilong (India)
- Coordinates: 24.7164°N 93.9408°E
- Country: India
- State: Manipur
- District: Thoubal

Area
  - Total: 63 km^{2} (24 sq mi)

Population (2011)
  - Total: 28,749
  - Density: 460/km^{2} (1,200/sq mi)

Literacy
  - Literacy rate: 71.85%
  - Male: 82.97%
  - Female: 60.51%

Languages
  - Official: Meiteilon (Manipuri)
- Time zone: UTC+5:30 (IST)
- PIN: 795130
- Vehicle registration: MN
- Website: manipur.gov.in

Lilong is a town under Municipal Council in Thoubal district in the Indian state of Manipur. It is also the headquarters of the Lilong Subdivision in the Thoubal district. Lilong is one of the original settlements of Meitei Pangals (Manipuri Muslims), with land allotted to them here by the then ruler of Manipur, and it continues to be one of their largest settlements to the present day.

== Geography ==
Lilong is located near the confluence of the Imphal River with the Iril River, 30 km south of the Imphal city. It is divided across three districts: Imphal West, Imphal East and Thoubal district. The Thoubal part of the town, referred to as "Lilong (Thoubal)" in the census, is bounded by the Imphal River on the northwest and Iril River on the northeast. The Lilong Bridge over the Imphal River divides the Thoubal portion of the town with the Imphal portion, which is called Lilong Chajing or "Lilong (Imphal West)".

The Lilong (Thoubal) town is said to be 1.2 square kilometres in area, but the name "Lilong" applies to a much wider area with numerous villages considering themselves to be part of it. There is also a "minor part" of the town in the Imphal East district, to the north of the Imphal River.

The National Highway 102, (Note: The National Highway 102 used to be National Highway 39 under the old numbering system.) which is also part of the Asian Highway 1, passes through the Lilong town. It connects to the Imphal city in the north and Thoubal, Pallel and Moreh towns in the south. The Lilong town extends on both the sides of the highway.

On the west side of the town, there is a canal called Lilong Turel Ahanbi, which carries water from the Imphal River south to the villages in the Lilong area, and drains back into the Imphal River near Iramsiphai. It was dug in 1880 during the reign of Maharaja Chandrakirti Singh. Even though it is a man-made canal, it is referred to as the "Lilong river" in the local parlance.

The town is bounded in the east by the Iril River and, to its south, the hill of Waithou Ching, which contains a protected forest of the Manipur state.

== Demographics ==
Religion in Lilong-Thoubal (2011)
1. Islam 21,407 (86.0%)
2. Hinduism 3,143 (12.6%)
3. Christianity 229 (0.92%)
4. Other or none 118 (0.47%)

As of 2011 India census, Lilong (Thoubal) had a population of 28,749, with 14,433 males (50.19%) and 14,316 females (49.81%). The literacy rate of Lilong (Thoubal) was 71.85%, higher among males at 82.97% and lower among females at 60.51%, compared to the state average of 76.94% in Manipur.

== Vegetations ==
Lilong has been popular for major vegetable production like mustard, cauliflower, potato, etc. Rice is the main cultivating plant in the field. The Ngangou Loukon is one of the seven lakes in Manipur, and most of the cultivation comes from this field. As in other parts of Manipur, the monsoon plays a main role in cultivation.

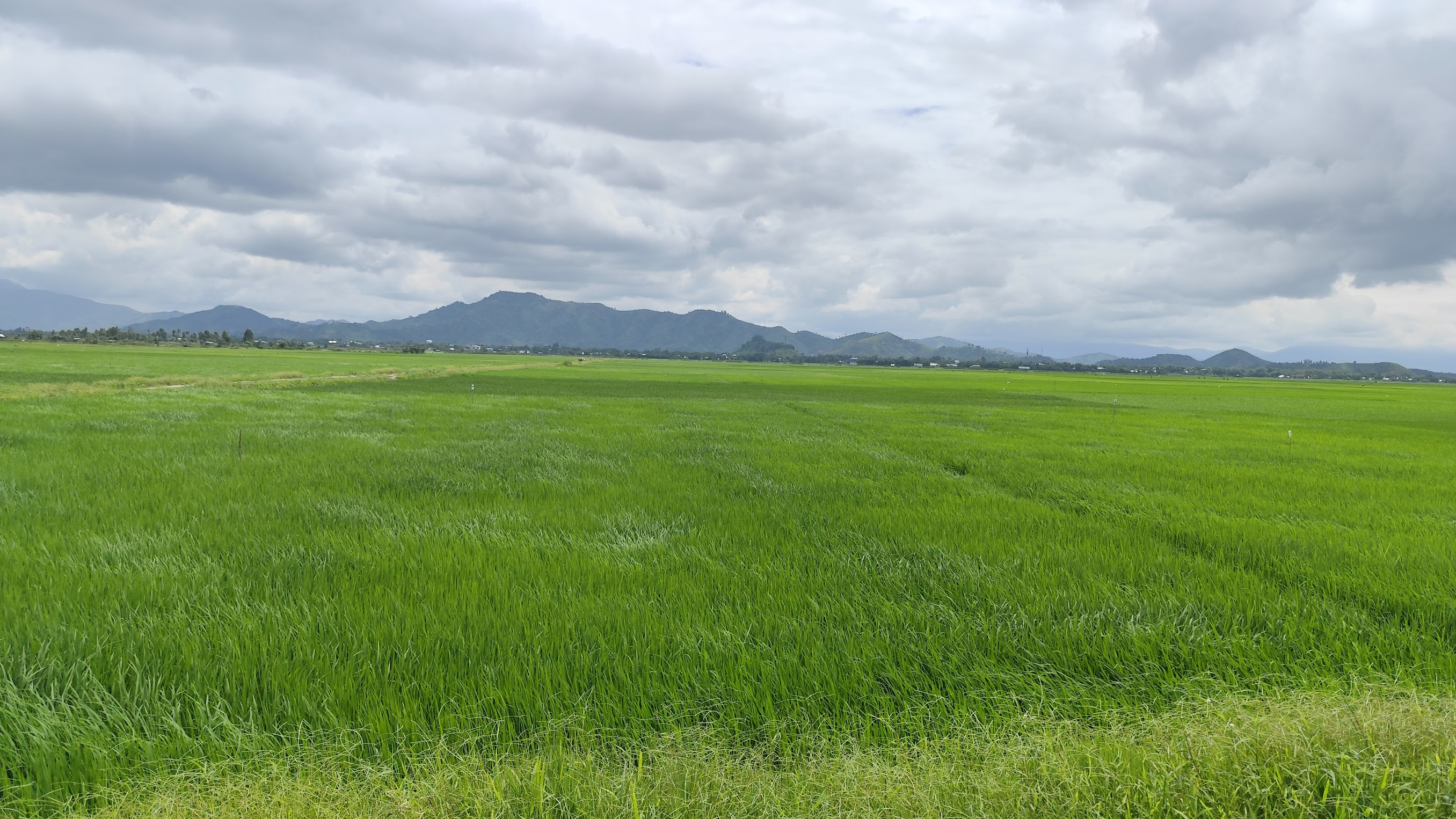
Ngangou Loukon in Lilong, Manipur, showing rice and vegetable fields.

== Politics ==
Lilong is part of the Inner Manipur (Lok Sabha constituency). It also falls under the Lilong Assembly constituency of the Manipur Legislative Assembly.
