= Thoubal district =

- District of Manipur
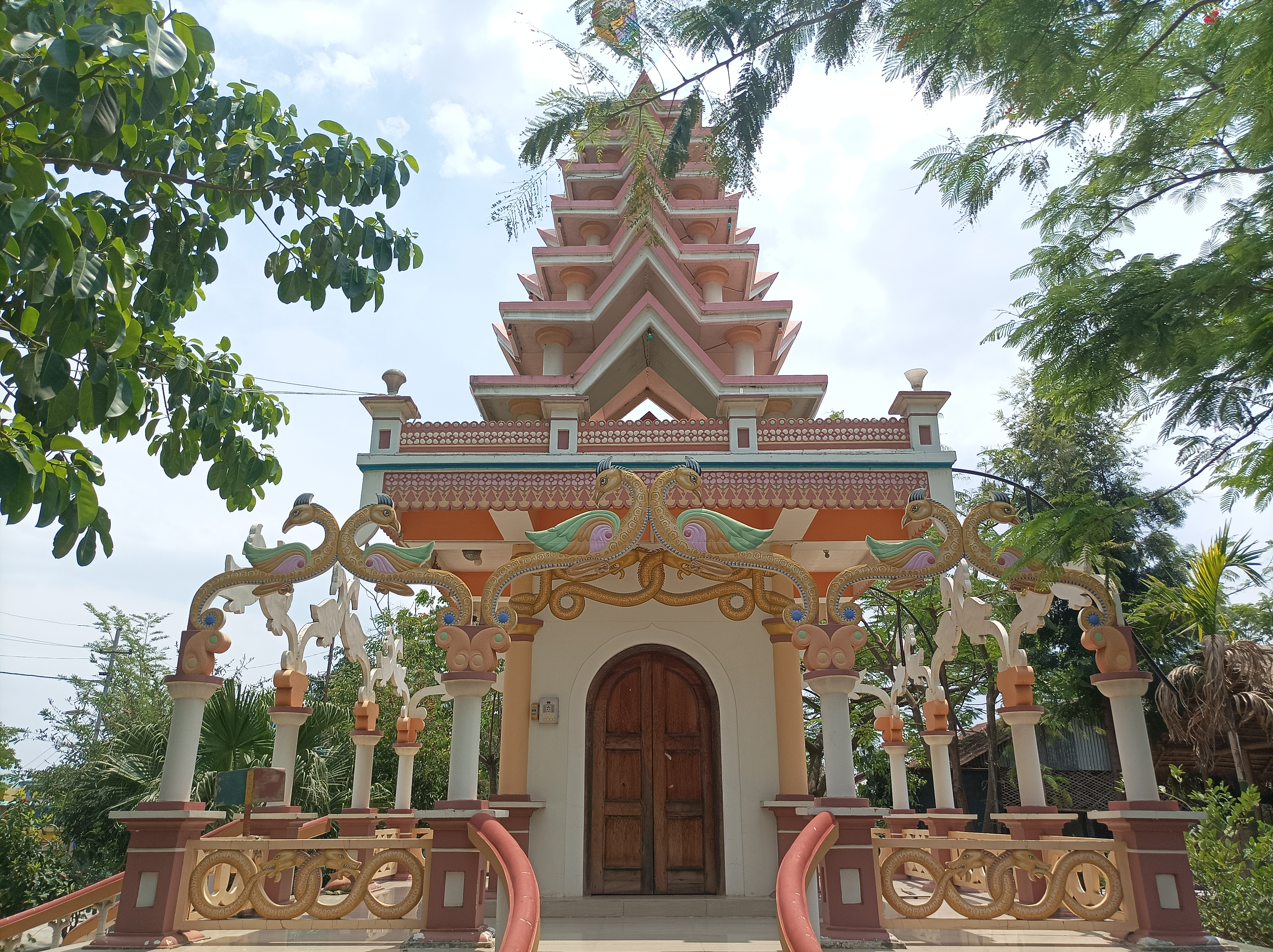
- Shrine of Pakhangba in Khangabok

- Location in Manipur
- Coordinates: 24.65°N 93.99°E
- Country: India
- State: Manipur
- Headquarters: Thoubal

Area
  - Total: 324 km^{2} (125 sq mi)
  - Rank: 14

Population (2011)
  - Total: 286,687
  - Density: 885/km^{2} (2,290/sq mi)

Language(s)
  - Official: Meitei (officially called Manipuri)
- Time zone: UTC+5:30 (IST)
- ISO 3166 code: IN-MN-TH
- Vehicle registration: MN
- Website: thoubal.nic.in

Thoubal district (Meitei pronunciation:/ˈθɑʊbɑːl orˈθɑʊbəl/) is one of the sixteen districts of Manipur state in northeastern India. This district is bounded by Imphal East on the north, Kangpokpi District and Tengnoupal District districts on the east, Kakching district on the south and Imphal West district on the west. The district occupies an area of 324 km^{2}. The population as of 2011 is 286,687. Thoubal town is the district headquarters. This district is known for Khongjom, where the last battle of the independence of Manipur was fought in April 1891 against the British army.

== History ==
In May 1983 this district came into existence when Thoubal sub-division of the erstwhile Manipur Central District (later Imphal district) with all its administrative units was transferred to form a new district. Later, in November 1983, Thoubal district was divided into Thoubal and Kakching sub-divisions comprising Kakching and Waikhong Tehsils. In 2016, Thoubal district was further divided into 2 districts: Thoubal district and Kakching district.

== Geography ==
The district occupies the larger part of the eastern half of the Manipur Valley. The shape of the district is an irregular triangle with its base facing north. It lies between 23° 45' – 24° 45' North latitudes and 93° 45' – 94° 15' East longitudes. Its average elevation is about 790 m above the sea level. The district is dotted by a few hillocks and hills of low heights. Of these, Punam hill has an elevation of 1009 m above the sea level.

=== Rivers and lakes ===
The Imphal river and the Thoubal river are the most significant rivers that flow through the district. The Thoubal River originates in the hill ranges of Ukhrul and is an important tributary of the Imphal River. It passes through Yairipok and Thoubal before joining the Imphal at Irong near Mayang Imphal. The Imphal River rises in the hills of Senapati district and flows south. It forms the northern and western boundaries of Thoubal district. Other rivers in the district are the Wangjing, the Arong and the Sekmai. These rivers originate in the hills of Ukhrul district. The Arong River flows through Khangabok and falls into Kharung Pat. The Wangjing River flows west via Heirok and Wangjing before joining the Loushi Pat.

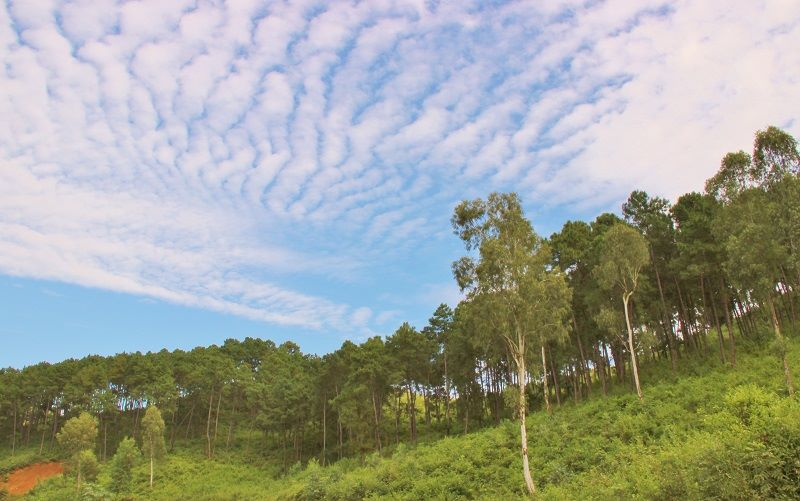
Small hillock in Thoubal

The southwestern part of the district is a part of the Loktak Lake region and this area has a number of shallow and rain fed lakes, the important ones being Kharung, Ikop, Pumlen, Lousi and Ngangou. The Waithou Lake in the northern part of the district is formed by the drainage waters collected between Waithou hill on the west and the villages and paddy fields on the east.

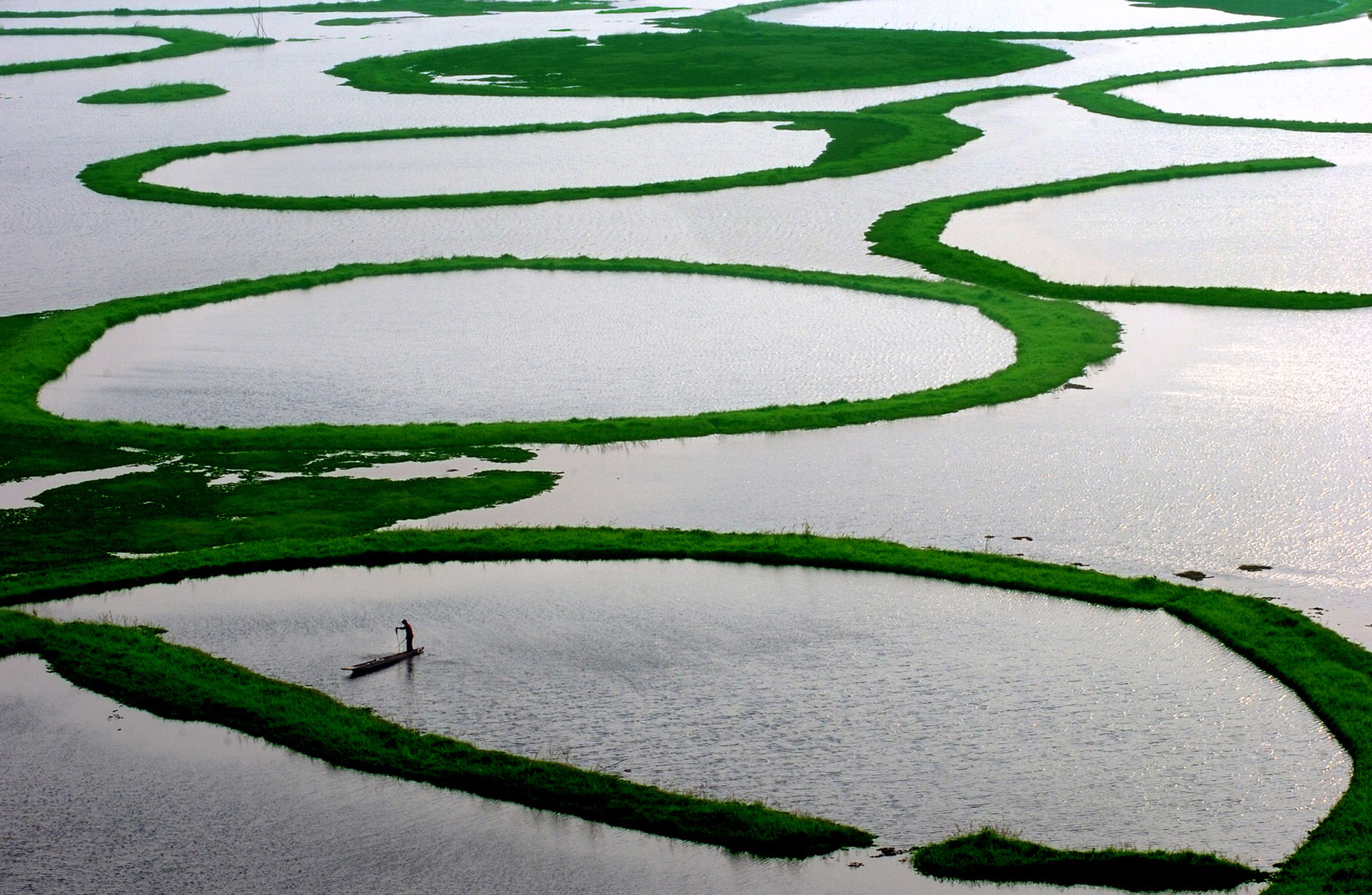
Fishing at Loktak Lake

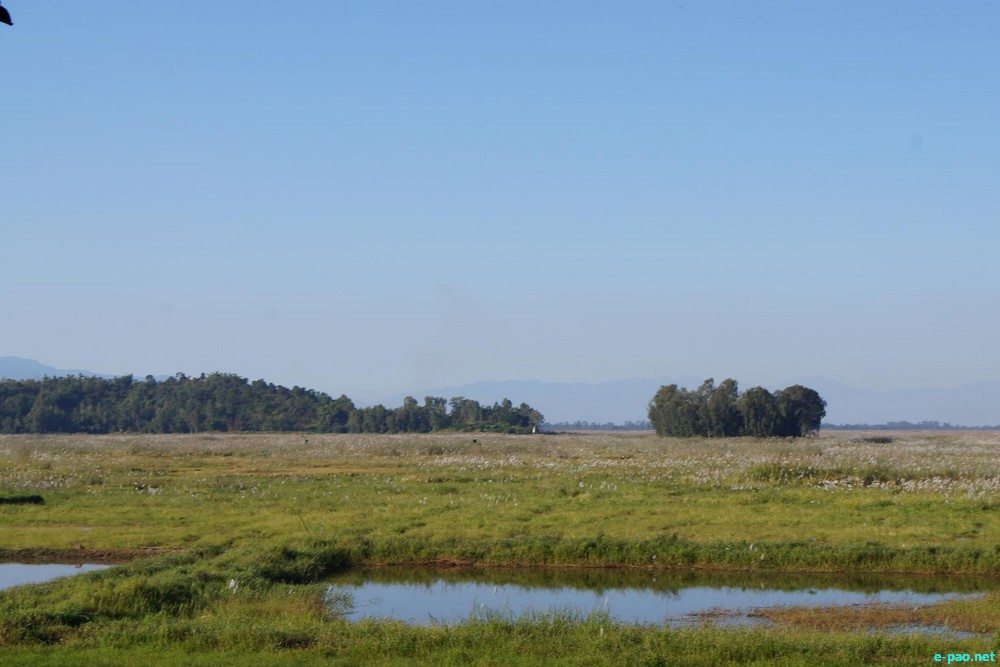
Pumlen lake

=== Climate ===
The district has a moderate climate with relatively abundant and widespread rainfall. The rainy season starts in June and continue till September. Intermittent rains continue till October. The winter season lasts from December to February. During the winter months light rainfall occurs under the influence of the northeast monsoon. The average minimum temperature during winter is 4–6 °C, sometimes the minimum temperature goes below 0 °C. April and May are the summer season. The average maximum temperature is 32–35 °C during these months, seldom the maximum temperature goes beyond 37 °C. Occasional thunderstorms occur during these months. The average annual rainfall was 1318.39 mm during the period 1983–89.

== Economy ==
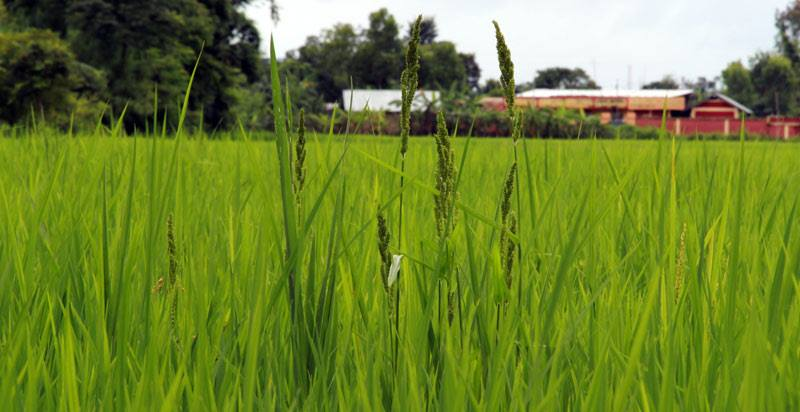
Green paddy field in Thoubal district

Agriculture is the most important source of livelihood for the people of this district of Manipur. More than 70 per cent of the total population of the district is directly or indirectly engaged in agricultural activities. The valley is fertile and the topography of Thoubal District provides good opportunity for irrigation, natural as well as artificial. Rice accounts for above 90 per cent of the total land area under cultivation. The soil of the district is fertile and with the help of irrigation facilities from the Imphal barrage double cropping is widely practiced in the district. In some areas, even triple cropping is practiced - first paddy crop starting late February or early March, second paddy crop in July and early August and the third crop of mustard seeds, pulses, etc. in November. Other crops grown in Thoubal District are sugarcane, oilseeds, maize, potatoes, pulses, chilies, etc.

The district was the largest producer of sugarcane in Manipur. Its cultivation is mainly confined to Wangjing-Tentha, Kakching, Kakching Khunou and Wabagai.

Although maize is grown throughout the district, it is cultivated as major cash crop around Serou, Pallel and Kakching belt. Oilseeds, mainly mustard seeds, are found all over the district. Recently cultivation of sunflower has also started. Vegetables such as cabbages, cauliflower, different kinds of peas, gourds, pumpkins, etc. are cultivated here. Among the plantation crops, pineapples are the most important and are cultivated in the slopes of low hills and hillocks it is Mainly cultivated in Waithou hill range and Sharam hill. Another important sector of economy of Thoubal District is Animal Husbandry. Important livestock found in Thoubal District are cattle, buffaloes, goats, pigs, etc. Significant progress have been made in the district in the direction of milk production, breeding of better varieties of cattle and poultry, and generation of employment through piggery and poultry development. Recently a dairy production firm is planning to open in Khangabok. Khangabok is famed throughout Manipur for Tule, (Schoenoplectus acutus) know locally as Kouna, based handicrafts too. Kouna is used for making seating mat (phak), stool (mora), chair, mattress and various other crafts.

Fishing also contributes to the economy of Thoubal District. Fishing provides an important occupation for a large number of people in the district. Fishing is commonly practiced in villages such as Tentha, Leishangthem, Wabagai, Khangabok, Kakching-khunou and Wangoo.

After the construction of 4- Laning of Imphal – Moreh Section of NH 39 by GR Infraprojects Ltd under NHIDCL, new small businesses like hardware store, roadside cafe, etc. are spawning up.

== Places of interest ==
=== Khongjom ===
Khongjom is the site where the last battle of the Anglo-Manipur War of 1891 was fought between the Manipuris and the British soldiers. It is situated 10 km to the south of Thoubal town and 32 km from Imphal. Khongjom War Memorial Park is located on the top of Kheba hillock. A statue of Paona Brajabashi is also located here. Every year on 23 April, Khongjom Day is celebrated at this spot.

=== Waithou ===
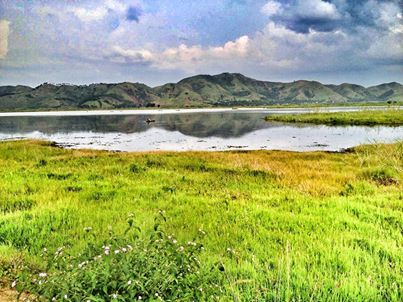
Waithou lake

Waithou has an inspection bungalow on the hill-side overlooking the Waithou Lake.

Pineapples are grown in the area. It is on the National highway about 3 km from the district headquarters.

== Demographics ==
Historical population
Year	Pop.	±%
1951	99,631	—
1961	135,462	+36.0%
1971	182,500	+34.7%
1981	232,675	+27.5%
1991	293,958	+26.3%
2001	364,140	+23.9%
2011	422,168	+15.9%
2011 Thoubal district (includes the present Kakching district); Source: Census of India

According to the 2011 census Thoubal district has a population of 422,168 roughly equal to the nation of Malta. This gives it a ranking of 555th in India (out of a total of 640). The district has a population density of 818 inhabitants per square kilometre (2,120/sq mi). Its population growth rate over the decade 2001–2011 was 15.48%. Thoubal has a sex ratio of 1006 females for every 1000 males, and a literacy rate of 76.66%.

	Population	Percentage of Total Pop.
All Scheduled Tribes	1,808	0.6%
Kuki-Zo tribes (Note: The Kuki-Zo tribes include Gangte, Hmar, Paite, Simte, Sukte, Thadou, Vaiphei, Zou, and some smaller tribes designated as "Any Kuki" and "Any Lushai (Mizo)".) (Note: The low number of Kuki-Zo tribes is deceptive because many tribal villages that might appear to be geographically within the Bishnupur district regard themselves as belonging to the adjoining hill district.)	495	0.2%
Naga tribes (Note: The Naga tribes include Angami, Kabui, Kacha Naga, Mao, Maram, Poumai, Sema and Tangkhul.)	696	0.2%
Old Kuki/Naga (Note: The Old Kuki tribes retaining the Kuki classification include: Aimol, Chiru, Kom, Koireng, Kharam, and Ralte. The tribes under the Naga umbrella include: Anal, Chothe, Koirao, Lamkang, Maring, Moyon, Monsang, Purum and Tarao.)	583	0.2%

After the separation of Kakching district, the residual Thoubal district had a population of 286,687. The residual district had a sex ratio of 1002 females per 1000 males. 35.82% of the population lived in urban areas. Scheduled Castes and Scheduled Tribes made up 0.43% and 0.23% of the population respectively. Manipuri was the predominant language, spoken by 99.35% of the population.

=== Religion ===
Religion in Thoubal district (2011)
Religion	Percent
Hinduism	63.27%
Islam	25.42%
Sanamahi	10.03%
Christianity	1.02%
Other or not stated	0.26%

Subdivision	Hinduism	Islam	Sanamahi	Others
Thoubal	74.39%	15.47%	9.17%	0.96%
Lilong	20.62%	75.86%	2.94%	0.58%

== Transportation ==
Transports system in this district is good. All the important towns and villages are well connected with district headquarters and other sub-divisional headquarters. There are regular taxis playing between Thoubal to Kakching and other places.

=== Roads ===
As the Asian highway AH-1 passes through the center of the district the road connection in this district is good. Most of the important towns in this district are connected with this highway. The other important state highways in this district are Mayai-lambi road, Indo-Burma-Sugunu road and Imphal Yairipok road etc. Other important district roads are Thoubal-Leishangthem-Mayang Imphal road, Thoubal-yairipok-Sekhong sekmai road, Wangjing-Heirok-Machi road, Wangjing-tentha-Wabgai road, Khangabok-Sangaiyumpham-Tentha road, Kakching-Machi road, Pallel-Chandel road, Sugunu-Saikot-Lamka road, Sugunu-Serou-CH.karong road.

== Education ==
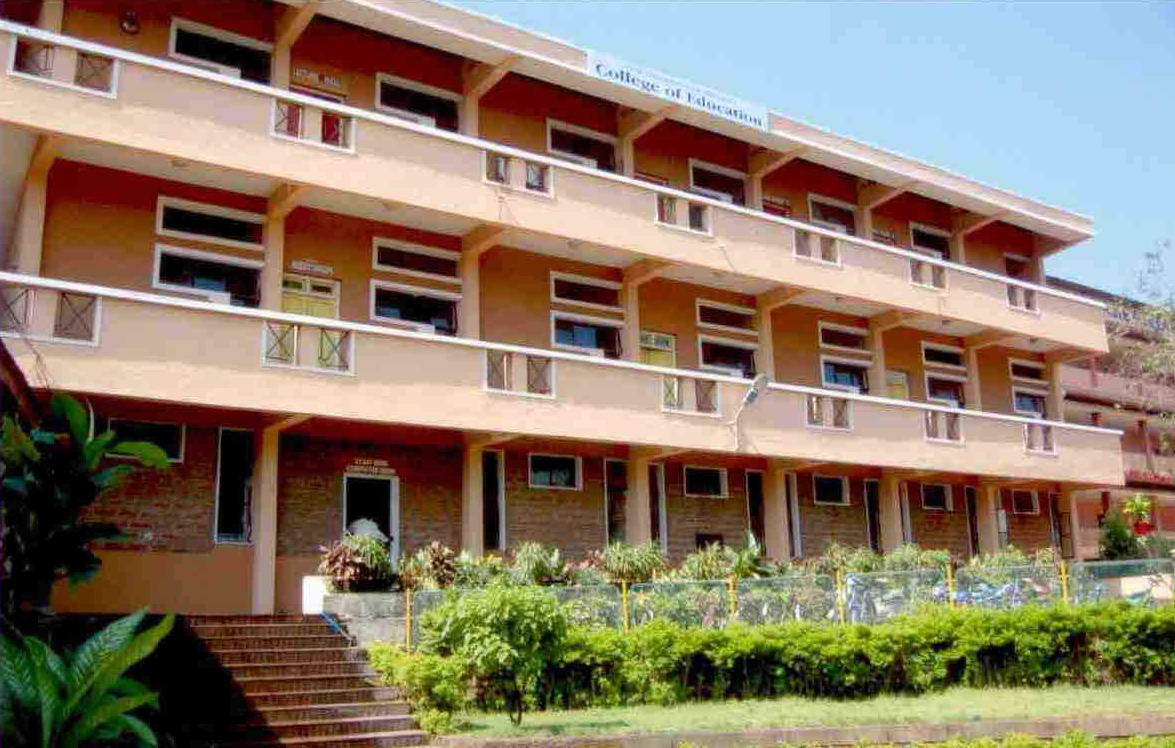
Thoubal College

Thoubal town is the main educational hubs of the district. Thoubal College and Waikhom Mani Girls' College are the major degree colleges in the district. Beside this many other colleges are in the district. A nursing college inside the district hospital Thoubal has been under construction. Some schools are K.M blooming Eng. School Khangabok, Evergreen Flower Eng. school Thoubal. New Higher Secondary School has spawn up at the Thoubal town namely Fancier Abhiram, New Era and Vision Creative Higher Secondary.

== Health ==
Hospitals in Thoubal are:-

- Thoubal District Hospital Khangabok

== Administrative divisions ==
The district is divided into 2 sub-divisions/revenue divisions:

- Thoubal
- Lilong

In 2016,Kakching is carved out from Thoubal district as a separate district comprising the sub-divisions of Kakching and Waikhong.

The 10 Vidhan Sabha constituencies located within the undivided district are: Lilong, Thoubal, Wangkhem, Heirok, Wangjing-Tentha, Khangabok, Wabagai, Kakching, Hiyanglam, and Sugnu.

Thoubal and Kakching are the municipal towns and Lilong, Wangjing, Yairipok, Waikhong, Hiyanglam, and Sugnu are other small town in the undivided district.

There are 6 Tehsils/Circles under SDC: Lilong, Irong Chesaba, Thoubal, Yairipok, Heirok and Khongjom. There are 83 revenue villages. Total number of Local Bodies are 32 (6 Municipalities and 27 Gram Panchayats).

=== Important offices in Thoubal District ===
- Deputy commissioner office Thoubal Athokpam
- District Road transport office Thoubal Athokpam
- Mini Secretariat complex Thoubal Athokpam
- District Hospital Khangabok
- Telephone Exchange BSNL Khangabok
- District Fishery Research Centre Khangabok
- District Superintendent of Police Headquarters Khangabok
- District Civil Court Khangabok

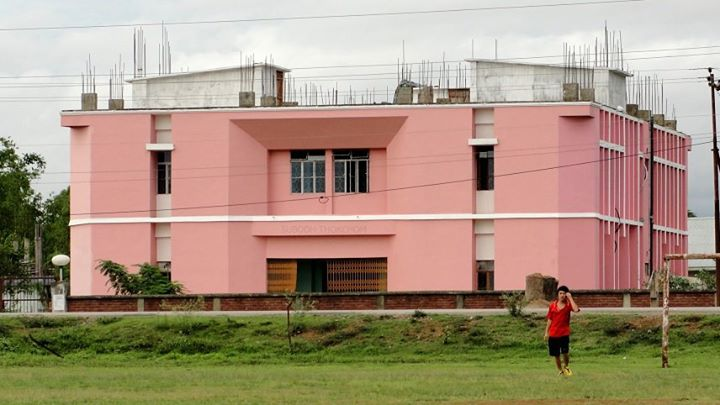
civil court KBK

- District Rice Research Center Khangabok
- District Sericulture Research Center Khangabok
- Food Corporation of India Khangabok
- Zonal Education Office Thoubal
- Public Works Department Thoubal
- Public Health Engineering Department Thoubal
- BSNL office Kakching
- LIC office Kakching

== Areas under Imphal Urban Agglomeration ==
- Lilong

== Sports Ground ==
List of Sports ground in Thoubal are:-

- Thoubal District Table Tennis Indoor stadium Thoubal
- BASU ground Khangabok
- Kodompokpi Football Stadium Wangjing
- DSA ground Kakching

== See also ==
- List of populated places in Thoubal district
