= Ngopa =

- village
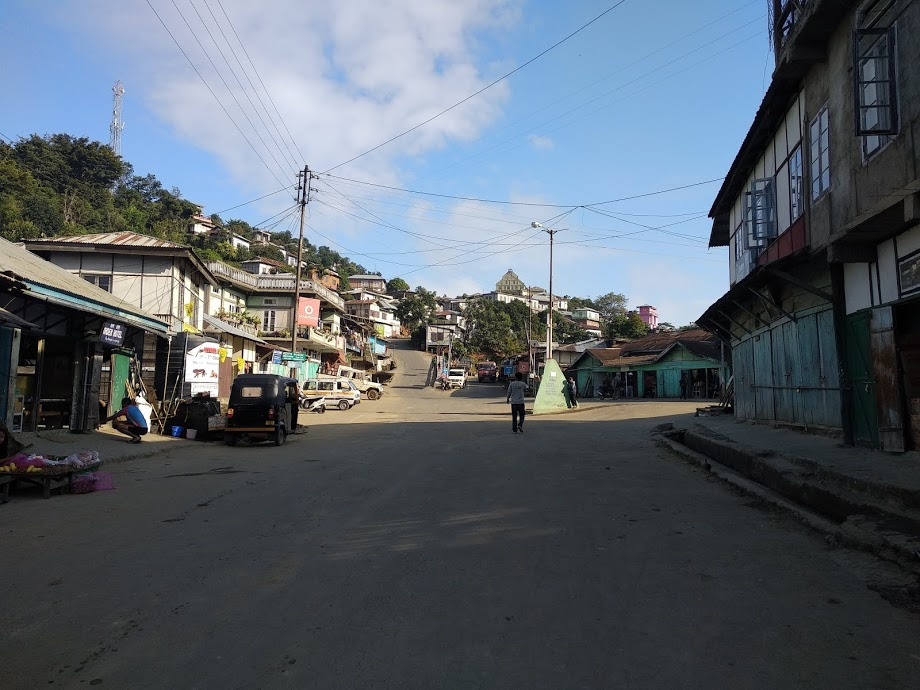

- Location within Mizoram Location within India
- Coordinates: 23°53′10″N 93°12′43″E
- Country: India
- State: Mizoram
- District: Saitual
- Elevation: 1,127 m (3,698 ft)

Population (2011)
  - Total: 4,155

Languages
  - Official: Mizo
- Time zone: UTC+5:30 (IST)
- PIN: 796290
- Telephone code: 03831
- Vehicle registration: MZ-04

Ngopa is a town in the Saitual district of Mizoram, India. It is located in the Ngopa R.D. Block, and it serves as headquarters for that block.

== People ==
According to the 2011 census, 945 families resided in Ngopa. The population was 4,155, of which 2,168 were males, and 1,987 were females. There were 607 children under the age of six, which makes up 14.61% of the total population of the village. The average Gender Ratio of Ngopa is 917, which is lower than the Mizoram state average of 976. The Child Gender Ratio for Ngopa was 927, lower than the Mizoram average of 970.

== Government Offices ==
There are many government offices in Ngopa, including the Sub Divisional Office (Civil) and Block Development Office. Hrianghmun, Teikhang, Kawlbem, Lamzawl, Vaikhawtlang, Selam, Pawlrang, Changzawl, Hliappui, and Saichal are the villages within Ngopa Block.
