= List of populated places in Imphal East district =

Villages in Imphal East district of Manipur, India

The Imphal East district of Manipur state in India is divided into 3 subdivisions. At the time of the 2011 Census of India, the Jiribam district (split in 2016) was a part of the Imphal East district.

== Subdivisions ==
The district has 3 subdivisions:

Name	Population	Effective literacy rate	Sex ratio	SC population %	ST population %	Census code (2011)
Sawombung	86162	78.52%	1007	0.27%	4.49%	01884
Porompat	244089	87.48%	1037	0.13%	7.08%	01885
Keirao Bitra	82024	72.1%	1011	9.59%	1.24%	01886

== Towns ==
The district has following towns:

Name	Type	Block	Population	Effective literacy rate	Sex ratio	SC population %	ST population %	Census code (2011)
Lamlai	Nagar Panchayat	Sawombung	4601	83.98%	961	0.0%	0.0%	801494
Imphal (minor part)	Municipal Council + Out growth	Porompat	81705	88.67%	1062	0.24%	15.8%	801487
Porompat	Census Town	Porompat	6191	88.81%	1081	0.1%	0.27%	270312
Torban (Khetri Leikai) / Kshetri Leikai	Census Town	Porompat	5459	91.32%	1076	0.05%	0.2%	270313
Khongman	Census Town	Porompat	6096	91.76%	1092	0.0%	0.0%	270314
Luwangsangbam	Census Town	Porompat	3458	90.46%	1063	0.12%	11.34%	270315
Heingang	Census Town	Porompat	6115	84.93%	1010	0.0%	0.0%	270316
Lairikyengbam Leikai	Census Town	Porompat	4586	91.22%	1096	0.0%	0.13%	270317
Laipham Siphai	Census Town	Porompat	5268	93.07%	1034	0.0%	39.83%	270318
Khurai Sajor Leikai	Census Town	Porompat	7987	91.08%	1079	0.0%	0.14%	270319
Chingangbam Leikai	Census Town	Porompat	4904	88.89%	1062	0.0%	0.0%	270320
Kshetrigao	Census Town	Porompat	10534	78.24%	1071	0.0%	0.0%	270321
Thongju	Census Town	Porompat	10836	89.04%	1057	0.0%	0.0%	270322
Kiyamgei	Census Town	Porompat	5336	82.84%	1030	0.0%	0.0%	270323
Lilong (Thoubal)	Nagar Panchayat	Keirao Bitra	2012	88.79%	1006	0.0%	0.0%	801476
Andro	Nagar Panchayat	Keirao Bitra	8744	64.42%	1030	87.28%	0.62%	801495

== Villages ==
The district has following villages:

=== Sawombung subdivision ===
Name	Population	Effective literacy rate	Sex ratio	SC population %	ST population %	Census code (2011)
Khongjil Khongjal	161	72.06%	940	0.0%	0.0%	270204
Matakhong	530	55.06%	956	0.0%	0.0%	270205
Makeng Chonglou	520	73.11%	1114	0.0%	1.73%	270206
Makeng Nunglou	400	68.01%	932	0.0%	0.0%	270207
Makeng	281	62.55%	1036	9.61%	0.0%	270208
Thangal Surung	663	58.54%	922	0.0%	8.6%	270209
Nurathel	102	85.42%	925	0.0%	100.0%	270210
Sadu Koireng	456	46.95%	991	0.0%	2.85%	270211
Purum Khunou	182	56.38%	1141	0.0%	0.0%	270212
Sadu Longa Koireng	331	62.77%	1056	0.0%	29.91%	270213
Purum Likli (Leitanpokpi)	1025	69.79%	1050	15.12%	0.1%	270214
Pukhao Naharup	1479	69.76%	977	0.0%	0.07%	270215
Pukhao Ahallup	463	82.29%	929	0.0%	0.0%	270216
Pukhao Khabam	593	81.27%	957	0.0%	0.0%	270217
Pukhao Laipham	618	84.42%	974	0.0%	0.0%	270218
Sagolmang	967	83.37%	752	0.0%	1.34%	270219
Khewa Company	666	71.28%	1024	0.0%	0.0%	270220
Yumnam Patlou	839	81.4%	885	0.0%	0.0%	270221
Uyumpok	2899	76.14%	973	0.0%	0.24%	270222
Khongbal Tangkhul	415	88.95%	986	0.0%	94.22%	270223
Lamboikhul	634	82.55%	1058	0.0%	0.0%	270224
Taretkhul	511	42.44%	1086	0.0%	0.2%	270225
Keibi Khullen	1331	85.5%	1032	1.58%	0.0%	270226
Keibi Kumuda	1867	86.42%	1027	0.0%	7.18%	270227
Keibi Leishangkhong	630	81.17%	975	0.0%	0.0%	270228
Keibi Heikak Mapal	859	66.99%	851	0.0%	5.59%	270229
Sinam	1015	74.18%	979	0.0%	25.62%	270230
Yumnam Khunou	1870	83.88%	1022	0.0%	0.05%	270231
Waiton	2704	79.3%	1006	0.0%	0.0%	270232
Sambei	651	80.46%	1015	0.0%	0.0%	270233
Chingkhu	642	82.11%	963	0.0%	0.0%	270234
Khundrakpam	4689	86.56%	1115	0.15%	1.96%	270235
Tangkham	1235	89.42%	1011	0.0%	0.0%	270236
Haraorou	1207	89.0%	1022	0.0%	0.0%	270237
Ngairangbam	305	53.68%	1163	0.0%	0.0%	270238
Morok Ingkhol	123	50.94%	732	0.0%	0.0%	270239
Sarouthel	132	72.07%	970	0.0%	0.0%	270240
Taorem	72	84.13%	846	0.0%	0.0%	270241
Pangei	2112	88.41%	968	0.0%	0.0%	270242
Thangjam Khunou	737	68.72%	1036	0.0%	0.0%	270243
Sekta	2934	77.39%	1007	0.24%	0.17%	270244
Pungdongbam	2539	84.83%	1059	0.0%	0.0%	270245
Itam	1186	83.19%	967	0.0%	24.11%	270246
Iyampal	2212	81.87%	1081	0.0%	20.52%	270247
Kangla Siphai	859	82.41%	1012	0.0%	0.0%	270248
Pourabi	1596	84.01%	1015	0.56%	0.0%	270249
Nungoi	2452	83.9%	1007	0.0%	4.98%	270250
Khabeisoi	3589	50.55%	1031	0.0%	1.25%	270251
Angom Lawai	1168	90.0%	1024	0.0%	0.0%	270252
Sangomsang	1701	91.06%	1027	0.0%	14.87%	270253
Phaknung	1305	87.21%	1030	0.0%	0.0%	270254
Chonthaba	1041	88.32%	979	0.0%	0.0%	270255
Sajeb	2049	88.42%	1025	0.0%	0.1%	270256
Sanjenbam	896	87.6%	1018	0.0%	0.0%	270257
Sangsabi	1178	76.45%	970	0.0%	0.0%	270258
Salakhul	41	85.37%	1050	0.0%	0.0%	270259
Takhel	1358	76.57%	997	0.0%	0.0%	270260
Kharasom	1537	67.15%	958	0.0%	0.0%	270261
Kangba Chingjil	668	87.65%	1037	0.0%	0.0%	270262
Kameng	1673	78.68%	1089	0.0%	0.0%	270263
Tellou	3328	84.12%	981	0.0%	12.89%	270264
Laikot	3765	77.24%	1017	0.11%	6.0%	270265
Nongren	1759	74.82%	1050	0.0%	0.0%	270266
Kakching	742	86.23%	1038	0.0%	0.0%	270267
Nongdam	850	70.44%	1024	0.0%	0.12%	270268
Oksu	871	66.57%	940	0.0%	0.34%	270269
Heirok	1348	44.51%	991	0.0%	60.46%	270270

=== Porompat subdivision ===
Name	Population	Effective literacy rate	Sex ratio	SC population %	ST population %	Census code (2011)
Kabo Siphai	1668	85.98%	998	0.0%	2.64%	270271
Nilakuthi	1357	88.67%	941	0.0%	1.18%	270272
Koirengei	1448	95.78%	302	6.98%	3.94%	270273
Maibakhul	687	82.83%	1082	0.0%	0.0%	270274
Mongjam	665	86.03%	1072	0.0%	0.0%	270275
Achanbigei	3123	85.44%	1002	0.0%	1.31%	270276
Matai	1140	80.56%	1004	0.0%	0.0%	270278
Kontha Khabam	3483	87.38%	990	0.0%	0.14%	270279
Kairang Meitei	1250	91.67%	1039	0.0%	0.0%	270280
Khomidok	4116	65.59%	1013	0.0%	0.0%	270281
Khurai Konsam Leikai	4162	89.6%	1068	0.0%	0.0%	270282
Kairang Muslim	3593	65.76%	1004	0.0%	0.0%	270283
Kontha Ahallup	2183	88.7%	1071	0.0%	0.0%	270284
Lamlongei	4100	89.81%	625	0.0%	20.32%	270285
Thangjam Leikai	1291	92.98%	1011	0.0%	0.0%	270286
Laishram Leikai	1851	89.03%	1027	0.0%	0.0%	270287
Moirang Kampu	1333	90.77%	1073	0.0%	0.0%	270288
Top Dusara (West)	1942	90.5%	1097	0.0%	0.05%	270289
Top Dusara (East)	2597	82.14%	1010	0.0%	0.0%	270290
Ningthoubung	2038	87.31%	1010	0.0%	0.0%	270292
Kongkham Leikai (part)	1762	91.4%	1075	0.23%	0.06%	270293
Khaidem Leikai	2724	89.1%	1033	0.0%	0.0%	270294
Khurai Khongnangkhong	2028	91.86%	1082	0.0%	0.0%	270295
Kshetri Bengoon	3843	76.4%	1014	0.0%	0.0%	270296
Wakha	595	50.93%	938	0.0%	0.0%	270297
Makhapat	891	89.85%	852	0.0%	0.0%	270298
Naharup	1962	85.59%	1040	0.0%	0.0%	270299
Top Naoria	4385	89.95%	1033	0.0%	0.0%	270300
Kongba Nongthombam Leikai	2167	89.72%	1100	0.0%	0.05%	270301
Gangapat	1476	92.26%	1088	0.0%	0.0%	270302
Keikhu Hao	588	75.51%	1100	0.0%	99.32%	270303
Thangbrijao	1454	77.29%	1048	0.0%	0.0%	270304
Uchkeckon	3751	90.64%	1068	0.0%	0.03%	270305
Nandeibam Leikai	3375	90.92%	1043	0.0%	0.0%	270306
Wangkhei Loumanbi	2067	88.9%	986	0.0%	0.05%	270307
Kitna Panung	2546	87.06%	1040	0.0%	0.08%	270308
Basihkhong	3042	91.41%	1095	0.0%	0.0%	270309
Loumanbi	161	86.92%	1091	0.0%	0.0%	270310
Lilong Hao	738	90.87%	968	0.0%	0.0%	270311

The following villages with 0 population were included in the 2011 census directory, but is no longer listed on the district website:

- Asei Loklen (census code 270277)
- Laingampat (census code 270291)

=== Keirao Bitra subdivision ===
Name	Population	Effective literacy rate	Sex ratio	SC population %	ST population %	Census code (2011)
Uchekon Khunou	1573	91.29%	1072	0.0%	0.0%	270326
Takhok Awang	1288	86.33%	1032	0.0%	0.0%	270327
Takhok Makha	601	75.05%	939	0.0%	0.0%	270328
Bamon Kampu	2788	88.04%	1022	0.0%	0.0%	270329
Machahal	463	79.31%	1040	0.0%	0.0%	270330
Kalika	284	85.71%	832	0.0%	0.0%	270331
Keirao Makting	5319	62.61%	1005	0.0%	0.0%	270333
Urup	4990	69.04%	1005	0.0%	0.0%	270334
Arapti	1495	72.74%	1076	0.0%	0.0%	270335
Kiyamgei Muslim	2614	76.35%	1031	0.0%	0.0%	270336
Keirao-Bitra	2470	83.02%	1046	0.0%	2.51%	270337
Keirao-Langdum	2275	81.38%	1074	0.0%	0.04%	270338
Langthrei Loukon	153	78.99%	1013	0.0%	31.37%	270339
Khanarok	570	76.51%	1050	0.0%	0.0%	270340
Keirao-Wangkhem	1071	82.79%	987	0.0%	0.93%	270341
Thiyam-Konjil	2077	75.3%	986	0.0%	0.0%	270342
Chanam Sandrok	1597	77.71%	957	0.0%	0.25%	270343
Waithou Chiru	554	61.57%	930	0.0%	99.64%	270344
Huikap	3383	73.29%	981	0.0%	0.21%	270345
Karpur Shungba	144	85.5%	1057	0.0%	100.0%	270346
Angtha	2913	76.76%	958	0.0%	0.0%	270347
Lemba Khul	22	85.0%	692	0.0%	0.0%	270348
Tulihal	5594	64.24%	1026	0.0%	0.0%	270349
Kaina	154	74.81%	1333	0.0%	0.0%	270350
Poiroukhongjil	3089	79.64%	1028	0.0%	0.03%	270351
Top-Chingtha	4985	70.77%	1031	0.0%	0.02%	270352
Yambem	5705	70.1%	972	0.0%	0.0%	270353
Nungkot	115	78.79%	1130	0.0%	100.0%	270354
Kamu Yaithibi	70	74.58%	1333	94.29%	0.0%	270355
Andro (part)	1014	48.09%	1004	16.86%	0.59%	270356
Changamdabi	6419	66.27%	1008	0.0%	0.0%	270357
Moirang Purel	2572	70.78%	982	0.0%	0.08%	270358
Itham	769	47.83%	982	0.0%	0.0%	270359
Monthou	306	58.17%	912	0.0%	0.0%	270360
Nung Brung	1832	78.88%	1033	0.0%	0.71%	270361

The following village with 0 population was included in the 2011 census directory, but is no longer listed on the district website: Leitambi (census code 270332).
