= Khaidem Leikai =

Village in Imphal East district, Manipur, India

- Village
- Location in Manipur, India Khaidem Leikai (India)
- Coordinates: 24.8136°N 93.9503°E
- Country: India
- State: Manipur
- District: Imphal East district
- Subdivision: Porompat

Government
  - Body: Gram Panchayat

Area
  - Total: 99.04 ha (244.7 acres)
- Elevation: 786 m (2,579 ft)

Population (2011)
  - Total: 2,724
  - Density: 2,750/km^{2} (7,124/sq mi)

Languages
  - Official: Meitei (Manipuri)
- Time zone: UTC+5:30 (IST)
- PIN: 795005
- Vehicle registration: MN
- Lok Sabha constituency: Inner Manipur
- Vidhan Sabha constituency: Khurai

Khaidem Leikai is a village located in the Porompat subdivision of Imphal East district, Manipur, India. With 2,724 residents living in 598 households across 99.04 hectares, the village has a balanced sex ratio (1,032 females for every 1,000 males) and a literacy rate of nearly 78%, according to the 2011 Census.

It is governed by a locally elected Sarpanch under the Panchayati Raj system.

== Demographics ==
- Population (2011): 2,724 (1,340 males; 1,384 females; Sex ratio: 1,033)
- Child population (0–6 years): 330 (12%)
- Literacy rate: 89% overall (Male: 94.7%, Female: 83.8%)

== Administration ==
Khaidem Leikai is part of the Porompat subdivision's Khurai Khaidem Leikai Gramme Panchayat. It is included in both the Inner Manipur Lok Sabha constituency and the Khurai Assembly constituency.

== Geography and transport ==
The distance between the Imphal East district offices and the Porompat sub-district headquarters is roughly 2 km. Imphal is the closest large city (about 4 km).

== See also ==
- Porompat
- Imphal East district
