= Luwangsangbam =

Census town in Imphal East district, Manipur, India

- Census town
- Location in Manipur, India Luwangsangbam (India)
- Coordinates: 24.87°N 93.90°E
- Country: India
- State: Manipur
- District: Imphal East district
- Tehsil: Porompat
- Nearest city: Imphal
- Lok Sabha constituency: Inner Manipur
- Manipur Legislative Assembly: Heingang

Government
  - Type: Panchayat

Population (2011)
  - Total: 3,458
  - Estimate (2025): 4,800

Languages
  - Official: Meitei
- Time zone: UTC+5:30 (IST)
- PIN: 795002
- Telephone code: 03848
- Vehicle registration: MN
- Website: manipur.gov.in

Luwangsangbam is a census town and village in the Porompat tehsil of Imphal East district in the North east Indian state of Manipur. Historically, it was the capital region of ancient Luwang dynasty.

== History and name ==
The Luwangsangbam name is connected to Luwang—one of the seven clans (Meitei: Salai Taret) of the Meitei people. During the early centuries of the common era, the Luwang built one of the very first small principalities in the Manipur valley, with Luwangsangbam as its kangla (capital).

== Geography ==
Luwangsangbam is situated roughly 8 km north of the city of Imphal, where the terrain is smooth and where access to the Imphal River is available. Other nearby localities include Nilakuthi, Heingang, and Kairang Khomidok.

== Demographics ==
As at the 2011 census:

- The population was 3,458 with 1676 male and 1782 female. There were 396 children under 6 (11.45 per cent).
- The child sex ratio was 886 girls to 1000 boys.
- There were 1063 female people per 1,000 males, which was more than the state average of 985.
- The general literacy rate was 90.46 percent; male was 97.07 percent and female was 84.40 percent.
- The estimated population in 2025 is 4,800.

== Amenities and infrastructure ==
The town is covered by a local post office with PIN 795002. There are the events and festivals held at the Luwangsangbam Community Hall in Liberal College Road.

== Education ==
Liberal College, Luwangsangbam was founded in 1979. It began teaching on 10 August 1979, using classrooms at Srivan High School until its permanent campus was erected near NH-2. Accredited by Manipur University, it runs undergraduate programmes in Arts, Science, and Commerce and it has facilities of an indoor stadium and women hostel.

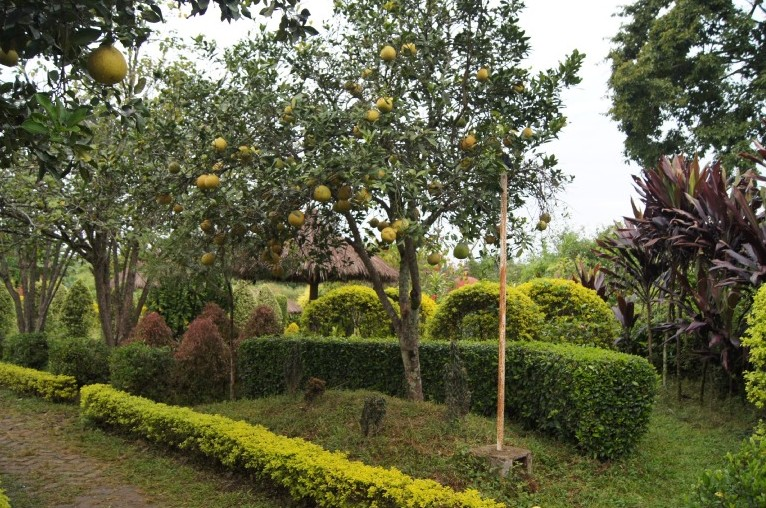
Ashei Ningthou Garden at the Matai Garden, Luwangsangbam in Manipur

== Community organisations ==
The Anita Chanu Weightlifting Academy Society encourages sports, focusing mainly on weightlifting.

== Administration and politics ==
Luwangsangbam is in the Heingang Assembly constituency of the Manipur Legislative Assembly, and the Inner Manipur Lok Sabha constituency.

== Postal and transport ==
- PIN code: 795002
- Telephone code: 03848
- Nearest railway station: Jiribam
- Nearest airport: Imphal Airport (~10 km)
- Nearby national highways:
  - NH 2 which runs from Dibrugarh, Assam to Tuipang, Mizoram.
  - NH 37, which runs between Badarpur, Assam and Imphal and NH37.
