= Keirao Bitra =

Keirao Bitra ꯀꯩꯔꯥꯎ ꯕꯤꯇ꯭ꯔ
- Subdivision
- Location within Manipur Location within India
- Coordinates: 24.75°N 94.03°E
- Country: India
- State: Manipur
- District: Imphal East

Population (2011)
  - Total: 82,024
  - Density: 561/km^{2} (1,450/sq mi)

Language(s)
  - Official: Meitei language (officially Manipuri language)
- Time zone: UTC+5:30 (IST)
- PIN: 795130
- Vehicle registration: MN
- Website: imphaleast.nic.in

Keirao Bitra is an administrative sub-division of Imphal East district in the northeastern state of Manipur, India. It is one of the three subdivisions of the district, alongside Porompat and Sawombung.

== Administration ==
Keirao Bitra is administered as a sub-division under the district administration of Imphal East. Sub-divisions in Manipur are typically headed by a Sub-divisional Officer (SDO), (Note: Also called Subdivisional Magistrate (SDM), Assistant Commissioner (AC), Sub Collector, or Revenue Divisional Officer (RDO) in other states.) who oversees revenue and general administrative functions.

The subdivision comprises the following SDC (Sub-Deputy Collector) circles:

- Keirao Bitra SDC
- Tulihal SDC

== Demographics ==
According to the 2011 Census of India, Keirao Bitra sub-division;

- Had a total population of 82,024.
  - Rural population: 71,268 (≈86.9%)
  - Urban population: 10,756 (≈13.1%)
- Sex ratio: 1,011 females per 1,000 males
- Overall literacy rate: 72.1%
- Contains 2 towns and 35 villages.
- Covers an area of 146.2 km²

== See also ==
- List of populated places in Imphal East district
