= Sawombung =

Sawombung ꯁꯋꯣꯝꯕꯨꯡ
- Subdivision
- Location in India
- Coordinates: 24°53′42.67″N 94°0′3.55″E
- Country: India
- State: Manipur
- District: Imphal East

Population (2011)
  - Total: 81,561
  - Density: 415.6/km^{2} (1,076/sq mi)

Language(s)
  - Official: Meitei language (officially Manipuri language)
- Time zone: UTC+5:30 (IST)
- PIN: 795010
- Vehicle registration: MN
- Website: imphaleast.nic.in

Sawombung is an administrative sub-division of Imphal East district in the northeastern state of Manipur, India. It is one of the three sub-divisions of the district, alongside Porompat and Keirao Bitra.

== Administration ==
Sawombung is administered as a subdivision under the district administration of Imphal East. Subdivisions in Manipur are typically headed by a Sub-Divisional Officer (SDO) (Note: Also called Subdivisional Magistrate (SDM), Assistant Commissioner (AC), Sub Collector, or Revenue Divisional Officer (RDO) in other states.), who is responsible for revenue and general administrative functions.

The subdivision is further divided into two tehsils (SDC circles):

- Sawombung SDC
- Sagolmang SDC

These SDC circles are managed by Sub-Deputy Collectors (SDCs) and form the primary units of local revenue administration.

== Geography and demographics ==
According to data based on the 2011 Census of India, Sawombung subdivision:

- Covers an area of about 257 km²
- Has a population of approximately 86,162 people
- Contains 67 villages and 1 town

The subdivision is predominantly rural, with about 94.7% of the population living in rural areas.

The overall literacy rate is around 78.5%, and the sex ratio is approximately 1007 females per 1000 males, according to census data.

== Education ==
Biramongol College is a general degree college located in Sawombung. It was established in 1973, and offers undergraduate courses in arts and sciences. It is affiliated to Manipur University.

== See also ==
- Imphal
- Imphal East
- List of populated places in Imphal East district

== External sites ==
- "Map of Sawombung Sub Division, Imphal East District, Manipur" (PDF). Government of Manipur. Department of Science and Technology, Government of Manipur.
