= Tumukhong =

- Village
- Tumukhong Location in Manipur, India
- Country: India
- State: Manipur
- District: Imphal East

Population
  - Total: 1,000

Tumukhong is a small village in Imphal East district in Indian state of Manipur It is located 24 km towards East from District headquarters Porompat and also 24 km from State capital Imphal.

== Demographics ==
Tumukhong's population is about 1000 people according to the 2011 Census. It is on the border of the Imphal East District, Ukhrul in the east, Sadhar Hills district in the west. Thoubal is south of this village.
