= Dinesh Singh Soraisham =

Indian footballer (born 1997)

Dinesh Singh
Personal information
- Full name: Dinesh Singh Soraisham
- Date of birth: 5 December 1997 (age 28)
- Place of birth: Huikap, Manipur, India
- Height: 1.75 m (5 ft 9 in)
- Position: Centre-back

Team information
- Current team: NorthEast United
- Number: 2

Senior career*
Years	Team	Apps	(Gls)
2017	Real Kashmir	4	(0)
2018–2021	TRAU	23	(0)
2021–2023	Sreenidi Deccan	23	(2)
2023–	NorthEast United	35	(0)
- * Club domestic league appearances and goals as of 16:24, 12 March 2023 (UTC)

Dinesh Singh Soraisham (Meitei: Soraisham Dinesh Singh, born 5 December 1997) is an Indian professional footballer who plays as a defender for Indian Super League club NorthEast United.

== Personal life ==
Dinesh is the younger brother of Sandeep Singh, who is also a professional footballer, and is currently playing for Indian Super League side Kerala Blasters.

== Career ==
=== Sreenidi Deccan ===
Singh made his debut for Sreenidi Deccan on 27 December 2021, against NEROCA in a 3–2 loss.

== Career statistics ==
=== Club ===
As of 12 April 2023

Club	Season	League			Cup		Continental		Total	
Club	Season	Division	Apps	Goals	Apps	Goals	Apps	Goals	Apps	Goals
Real Kashmir	2016–17	I-League 2nd Division	4	0	0	0	–		4	0
TRAU	2017–18	I-League 2nd Division	4	0	0	0	–		4	0
TRAU	2019–20	I-League	7	0	3 (Note: Appearance(s) in Durand Cup)	0	–		10	0
TRAU	2020–21	I-League	12	0	0	0	–		12	0
TRAU	Total		23	0	3	0	0	0	26	0
Sreenidi Deccan	2021–22	I-League	9	0	0	0	–		9	0
Sreenidi Deccan	2022–23	I-League	14	2	3	0	–		17	2
Sreenidi Deccan	Total		23	2	3	0	0	0	26	2
NorthEast United	2023–24	Indian Super League	0	0	0	0	–		0	0
Career total			50	2	6	0	0	0	56	2

== Honours ==
NorthEast United

- Durand Cup: 2024, 2025
