= Sandeep Singh Soraisham =

Indian footballer (born 1995)

Sandeep Singh
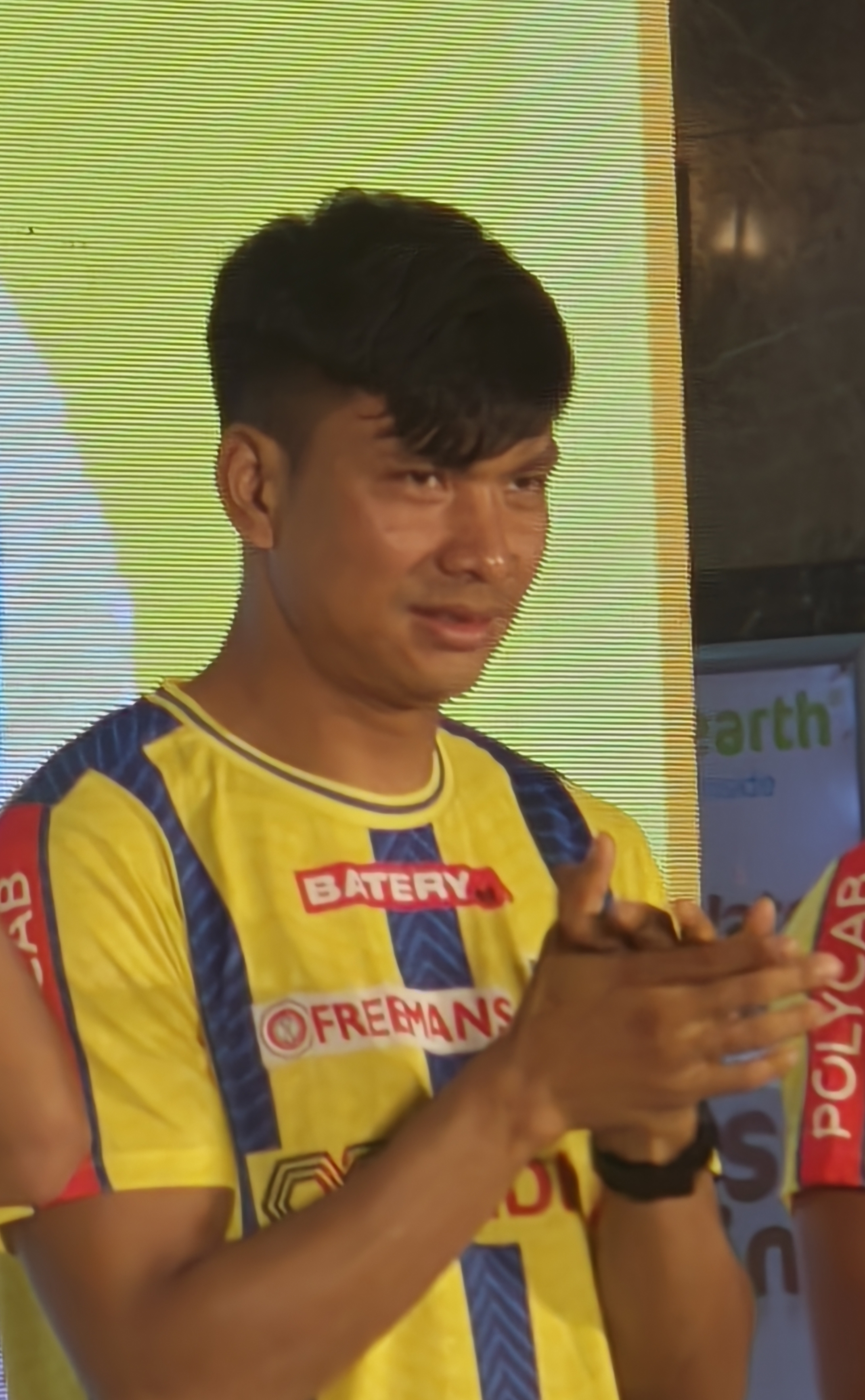
- Sandeep Singh in 2024

Personal information
- Full name: Sandeep Singh Soraisham
- Date of birth: 1 March 1995 (age 31)
- Place of birth: Huikap, Manipur, India
- Height: 1.79 m (5 ft 10 in)
- Position: Full back

Team information
- Current team: Kerala Blasters
- Number: 3

Youth career
- Shillong Lajong

Senior career*
Years	Team	Apps	(Gls)
2014–2017	Shillong Lajong	2	(0)
2017–2018	Langsning	4	(0)
2018–2019	ATK	0	(0)
2019–2020	TRAU	11	(0)
2020–	Kerala Blasters	79	(1)
- * Club domestic league appearances and goals as of 18 October 2026

Sandeep Singh Soraisham (Meitei: Soraisham Sandeep Singh, born 1 March 1995) is an Indian professional footballer who plays as a full back for Indian Super League club Kerala Blasters.

== Club career ==
=== Early career ===
Sandeep did his youth football at the academy of Shillong Lajong before being promoted to the senior team in 2014. He debuted for the senior team in a 5–2 loss against Pune FC on 30 January 2015, on which he came on as a substitute for Durga Boro in the 79th minute. Sandeep missed out on making any further appearances, was not played for the rest of the season, and missed out on making an appearance in the next season. He played his first match of the 2016–17 season against Aizawl on 17 January 2017, ending 2–1 to Aizawl. He left Shillong for the I-League 2nd division club Langsning SC for the 2017–18 season before leaving the club for former Indian Super League side ATK for the 2018season19 season, where he didn't feature for the club on that season. Sandeep signed for the I-League club TRAU FC for the 2019-20 season. He played his debut match for the club on 11 December 2019 against Mohun Bagan in a 4–0 loss. Sandeep played his last game for the club against Indian Arrows on 12 January 2020, in which they won 2–0.

=== Kerala Blasters ===
On 22 August 2020, Sandeep was signed by Indian Super League club Kerala Blasters on a one-year contract. He debuted for the Blasters on 13 December 2020 against Bengaluru FC, coming as a substitute in the 79th of the game in the centre back position which ended 4–2 for Bengaluru. In the match against FC Goa on 23 January 2021, Sandeep was used as a right back and won the Hero of the Match Award. After that match, Sandeep was used as a right-back in most matches. On 20 February 2021, the Blasters extended his contract for one more year, making him stay at the club till 2022.

Sandeep was named in the Blasters squad for the 2021 Durand Cup and made 2 appearances for the club in the tournament. He played his first match of the 2021–22 Indian Super League on 19 November 2021 in the season opener against ATK Mohun Bagan FC, which they lost 4–2. The season witnessed Sandeep's complete transformation from centre back to full back. When Harmanjot Khabra was injured, Sandeep started in most matches in the right-back position. He was also used as a left-back in few games.

On 4 June 2022, he extended his contract with the Blasters furthermore, which would keep him at the club till 2025. Sandeep made his first start of the 2022–23 Indian Super League season on 5 October in a 3–0 win against NorthEast United FC, where he assisted Sahal Abdul Samad's goal in injury time. On 26 December 2022, he scored his debut goal for the Blasters against Odisha FC in the 86th minute of the match, where he headed in a long ball by Bryce Miranda as the Blasters won the match 1–0, and Sandeep won the hero of the match award for his performance. On 22 January, during the final minutes of the away game against Mumbai City FC, Sandeep picked up an injury after colliding with Saviour Gama in the air while attempting to head the ball. He landed in a poor position, twisting his ankle, and was taken out on a stretcher after getting his head stitched. The club later confirmed that Sandeep had a fracture in his ankle and would undergo surgery.

Sandeep returned to the field on 8 October 2023, in the third league game of the 2023–24 season against Mumbai City FC in a 2–1 loss, by coming as a substitute in the 41st minute for injured Aibanbha Dohling and assisted for Danish Farooq's goal in the 57th minute.

On 30 July 2024, the Blasters announced the extension of Sandeep's contract until 2027.

== Career statistics ==
As of match played 12 March 2025

Appearances and goals by club, season and competition
Club	Season	League			Super Cup		Durand Cup		AFC		Total	
Club	Season	Division	Apps	Goals	Apps	Goals	Apps	Goals	Apps	Goals	Apps	Goals
Shillong Lajong	2014-15	I-League	1	0	0	0	—		—		1	0
Shillong Lajong	2015-16	I-League	0	0	0	0	—		—		0	0
Shillong Lajong	2016–17	I-League	1	0	0	0	—		—		1	0
Shillong Lajong	Total		2	0	0	0	—		—		2	0
TRAU	2019–20	I-League	11	0	0	0	—		—		11	0
Kerala Blasters	2020–21	Indian Super League	14	0	0	0	—		—		14	0
Kerala Blasters	2021–22	Indian Super League	14	0	0	0	2	0	—		16	0
Kerala Blasters	2022–23	Indian Super League	9	1	0	0	—		—		9	1
Kerala Blasters	2023–24	Indian Super League	15	0	0	0	—		—		15	0
Kerala Blasters	2024–25	Indian Super League	20	0	0	0	—		—		20	0
Kerala Blasters	2025–26	Indian Super League	5	0	0	0	—		—		5	0
Kerala Blasters	Total		77	1	0	0	2	0	—		79	1
Career total			90	1	0	0	2	0	0	0	91	1

== Personal life ==
Sandeep was born in Huikap, Manipur. His younger brother Dinesh is also a professional footballer, and is currently playing for the Indian Super League club NorthEast United FC.

== Honours ==
Kerala Blasters

- Indian Super League runner up: 2021–22
