= Heingang =

Town in Manipur, India

- Census town
- Location in Manipur, India Heingang (India)
- Coordinates: 24.8467°N 93.9503°E
- Country: India
- State: Manipur
- District: Imphal East
- Subdivision: Porompat

Population (2011)
  - Total: 6,115
- Time zone: IST (UTC+5:30)
- Postal code: 795002

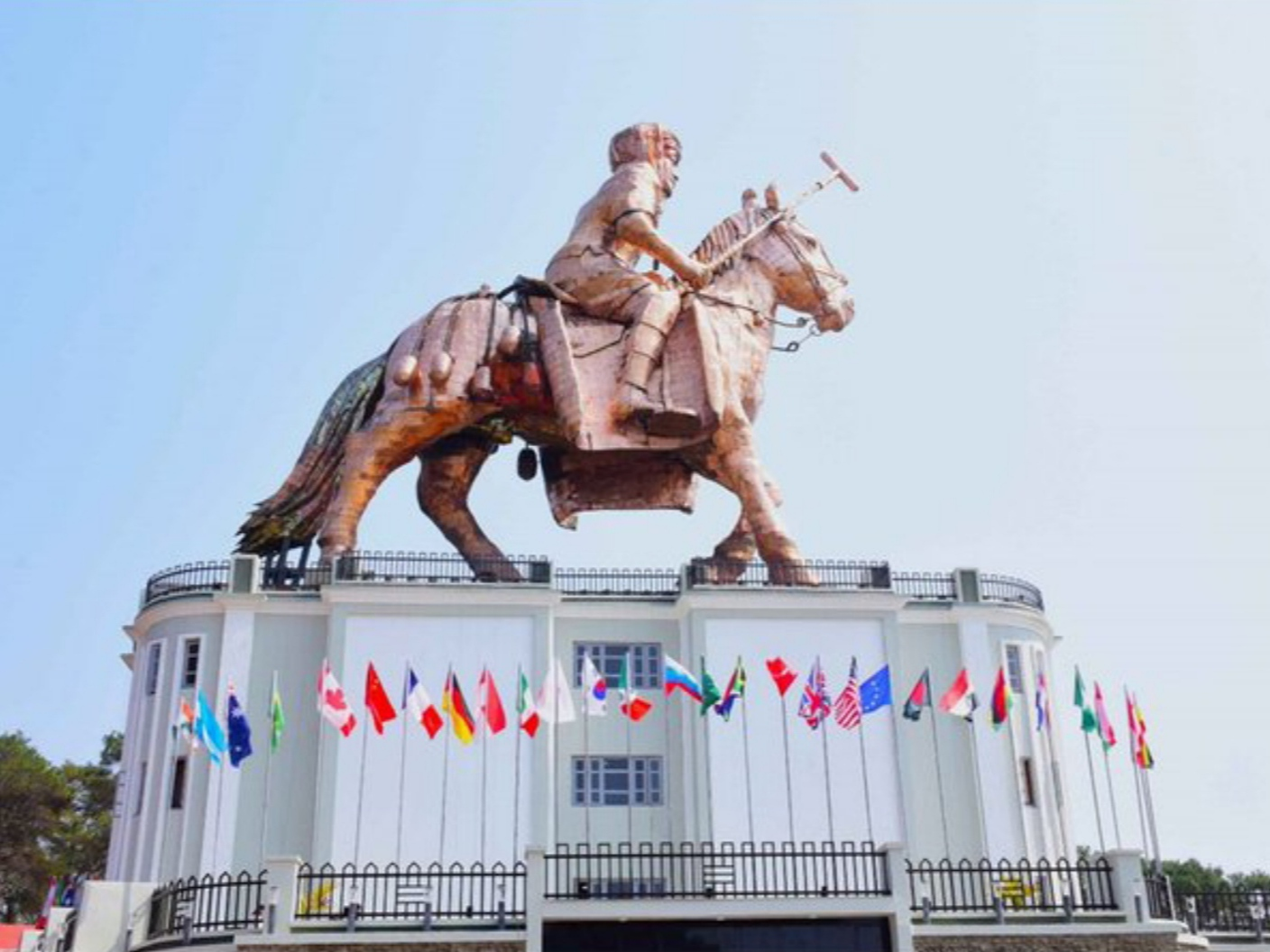
Marjing polo statue.

Heingang is a town located in the Porompat division of Imphal East district in Manipur. Heingang's cultural and religious significance is well known in the Meitei religion. It is also well known for being connected to traditional sports including Sagol Kangjei, the predecessor to modern polo.

== Demographics ==
According to the District Census 2011 Book for Imphal East:

- There are 6115 people living in Heingang in total
- Sex ratio: 1,010 females per 1,000 males
- Children (0–6 years): 726 (11.9%); child sex ratio: 936
- Literacy rate: 84.93%
- There are about 1,320 houses with access to essential civic services, like roads, water, and electricity

== Administration and politics ==
Heingang is a part of the Inner Manipur Lok Sabha constituency and is a component of the Heingang Assembly constituency (Constituency No. 2).

== Culture and landmarks ==
- Heingang Ching (Marjing Hill), a holy location, is connected to Ibudhou Marjing, the Meitei God of horses and polo.
- Marjing Polo Complex: The largest polo statue of the world.
- Ibudhou Marjing Lai Haraopham: The deity's shrine and cultural museum
- The Lai Haraoba Festival is a yearly tradition that honours the religious and cultural significance of the local deities.

== Geography ==
Heingang is surrounded by hills, paddy fields, and wooded areas and is roughly 4 km from the northeastern side of Imphal. One designated conservation area is the Heingang Reserved Forest.

== Economy ==
The majority of the local economy is based on agriculture, particularly rice farming. The region is also well known for its traditional handicrafts, such as the production of polo saddles and equipment.

== Transport ==
Heingang is roughly 6 km from Imphal via the Imphal Ring Road project and has good access to local roads. There are both private and state-operated taxis, autorickshaws, and buses in the area. Bir Tikendrajit International Airport, which is about 10 km away, is the closest airport.

== Environmental issues ==
According to some local reports, the illegal construction activities in the area have resulted in unchecked trespassing on wetlands and paddy fields.

== Education ==
- Heingang Higher Secondary School
- Heingang Primary School
- Additional private and public educational institutions offer services up to the senior secondary level.
