= Leishangthem =

Leishangthem may refer to:

- Salai Leishangthem, one of the seven clans of Meitei ethnicity
- any member of the clan Leishangthem
  - Leishangthem Tonthoingambi Devi, Indian actress
  - Uttam Leishangthem Singh, Indian footballer
  - Leishangthem Susindro Meitei, Indian politician
