= Kongba Nongthombam Leikai =

Kongba Nongthombam Leikai ꯀꯣꯡꯕ ꯅꯣꯡꯊꯣꯝꯕꯝ ꯂꯩꯀꯥꯢ
- Village
- Nongthombam Leikai
- Location in Manipur, India Kongba Nongthombam Leikai (India)
- Coordinates: 24.761°N 93.953°E
- Country: India
- State: Manipur
- District: Imphal East district
- Division: Porompat

Government
  - Type: Gram panchayat
  - Body: Thambalkhong gram panchayat

Population (2011)
  - Total: 2,167
- Time zone: UTC+5:30 (IST)
- Vehicle registration: MN

Kongba Nongthombam Leikai, is a large village situated in the Porompat subdivision of Imphal East district in Manipur, India. There are 476 families in the village. It is governed by the Thambalkhong gram panchayat.

== Demographics ==
As per the 2011 Census of India;

- Population: 2167 (1032 males and 1135 females).
- Sex ratio: 1100 females per 1000 males.
- Children under 6: 251
- Children sex ratio: 873 females per 1000 males.
- Literacy rate: 89.72%

== Land and Natural resources ==
- Total area is 107.4 hectares
- Total agricultural area is 5.44 ha
