= Khurai, Manipur Assembly constituency =

Legislative Assembly constituency in Manipur State, India

Coordinates: 24.82°N 93.96°E

Khurai
- Constituency No. 3 for the Manipur Legislative Assembly
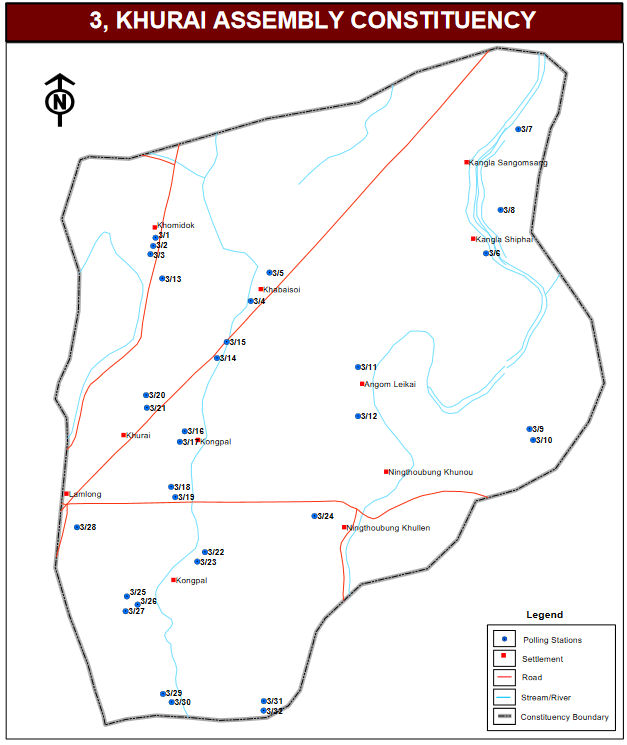

Constituency details
- Country: India
- Region: Northeast India
- State: Manipur
- District: Imphal East
- Lok Sabha constituency: Inner Manipur
- Established: 1967
- Total electors: 35,747
- Reservation: None

Member of Legislative Assembly
- 12th Manipur Legislative Assembly
- Incumbent Leishangthem Susindro Meitei
- Party: Bharatiya Janata Party
- Elected year: 2022

Khurai is one of the 60 Legislative Assembly constituencies of Manipur state in India.

It is part of Imphal East district. The constituency is composed of parts of Khurai tehsil, including the city of Khurai.

== Extent ==
Khurai assembly constituency is the 3rd of the 60 assembly constituencies of Manipur. It has 43 parts namely: 1-Khomidok (A), 2-Khomidok (A-1), 3-Khomidok (B), 4-Khomidok (B-1), 5-Khabeisoi (A), 6-Khabeisoi (B), 7-Sangomsang (A), 8-Sangomsang (B), 9-Phaknung, 10-Kangla Siphai, 11-Sajeb (A), 12-Sajeb (B), 13-Angom Leikai, 14-Moirang Kampu, 15-Khurai Konsam Leikai(A-1), 16-Khurai Konsam Leikai(A-2), 17-Khurai Konsam Leikai (B), 18-Khurai Konsam Leikai (C), 19-Kongpal Sajor Leikai (Awang), 20-Kongpal Sajor Leikai (Makha), 21-Khurai Thongam Leikai, 22-Khurai Thoidingjam Leikai (A), 23-Khurai Thoidingjam Leikai (B), 24-Khurai Sajor Leikai, 25-Khurai Puthiba Leikai (B), 26-Khurai Puthiba Leikai, 27-Khurai Nandeibam Leikai, 28-Khurai Laishram Leikai (A), 29-Khurai Laishram Leikai (B), 30-Ningthoubung, 31-Ningthoubung Khunou, 32-Khurai Kongpal Chingangbam Leikai, 33-Khurai Sajor Leikai (Makha), 34-Khurai Kongpal Chingangbam Leikai (B), 35-Khurai Kongpal Chingangbam Leikai (B-1), 36-Khurai Chingangbam Leikai (C ), 37-Khurai Chingangbam Leikai (D-1), 38-Khurai Chingangbam Leikai(D-2), 39-Khurai Kongkham Leikai (A), 40-Khurai Kongkham Leikai (B), 41-Khurai Kongkham Leikai (B-1), 42-Khurai Khongnangmakhong(A), and 43-Khurai Khongnangmakhong (B).

== Members of the Legislative Assembly ==
Year	Member	Party
1967	Kongbrailakpam Borthakur Sharma	Sanghata Socialist Party
1972	Atomba Ngairangbamcha	Indian National Congress
1974	Kongbrailakpam Borthakur Sharma	Socialist Party
1980	Chandam Manihar Singh	Manipur Peoples Party
1984	Atomba Ngairangbamcha	Independent politician
1990	Chandam Manihar Singh	Manipur Peoples Party
1995	Ningthoujam Bihari Singh	Independent politician
2000	Ningthoujam Bihari Singh	Manipur State Congress Party
2002	Ningthoujam Bihari Singh	Federal Party of Manipur
2007	Dr. Ngairangbam Bijoy Singh	Manipur Peoples Party
2012	Dr. Ngairangbam Bijoy Singh	Indian National Congress
2017	Leishangthem Susindro Meitei	Bharatiya Janata Party
2022	Leishangthem Susindro Meitei	Bharatiya Janata Party

== Election results ==
Vote share of winning candidates
2022	33.62%
2017	51.41%
2012	44.87%
2007	50.39%
2002	34.75%
2000	39.32%
1995	28.27%
1990	34.64%
1984	23.32%
1980	22.74%
1974	33.58%
1972	25.57%
1967	37.60%

=== 2027 Assembly election ===
2027 Manipur Legislative Assembly election: Khurai
Party	Candidate	Votes	%	±%
INC				
NDA				
NOTA	None of the above			
Majority				
Turnout				
gain from		Swing		

=== 2022 Assembly election ===
2022 Manipur Legislative Assembly election: Khurai
Party	Candidate	Votes	%	±%
BJP	Leishangthem Susindro Meitei	11,131	33.62%	−17.79%
NPP	Laitonjam Jayananda Singh	8,894	26.86%	
RPI(A)	Khagokpam Khamba Singh	6,792	20.51%	
JD(U)	Toijam Lokendro Singh	2,922	8.83%	
NCP	Khuraijam Ratankumar Singh	2,461	7.43%	
LJP(RV)	Heisnam Subhas Singh	385	1.16%	
CPI	R. K. Amusana Singh	356	1.08%	−1.67%
NOTA	Nota	169	0.51%	−0.59%
Margin of victory		2,237	6.76%	0.10%
Turnout		33,110	92.62%	1.29%
Registered electors		35,747		11.86%
BJP hold		Swing	-17.79%	

=== 2017 Assembly election ===
2017 Manipur Legislative Assembly election: Khurai
Party	Candidate	Votes	%	±%
BJP	Leishangthem Susindro Meitei	15,005	51.41%	
INC	Dr. N. G. Bijoy Singh	13,061	44.75%	−0.12%
CPI	R. K. Amusana Singh	800	2.74%	−4.21%
NOTA	None of the Above	322	1.10%	
Margin of victory		1,944	6.66%	−12.99%
Turnout		29,188	91.33%	1.96%
Registered electors		31,958		10.30%
BJP gain from INC		Swing	6.54%	

=== 2012 Assembly election ===
2012 Manipur Legislative Assembly election: Khurai
Party	Candidate	Votes	%	±%
INC	Dr. N. G. Bijoy Singh	11,618	44.87%	14.17%
AITC	Leishangthem Susindro Meitei	6,529	25.21%	
MSCP	Ngairangbam Bijoy Singh	5,917	22.85%	
CPI	R. K. Amusana Singh	1,801	6.96%	−11.35%
Margin of victory		5,089	19.65%	−0.04%
Turnout		25,895	89.27%	−2.31%
Registered electors		28,973		0.45%
INC gain from MPP		Swing	-5.53%	

=== 2007 Assembly election ===
2007 Manipur Legislative Assembly election: Khurai
Party	Candidate	Votes	%	±%
MPP	Dr. N. G. Bijoy Singh	13,326	50.39%	
INC	Ngairangbam Bijoy Singh	8,118	30.70%	7.21%
CPI	Laishram Sotinkumar	4,841	18.31%	−10.37%
SP	Atomba Ngairangbamcha	159	0.60%	
Margin of victory		5,208	19.69%	13.62%
Turnout		26,444	91.68%	3.43%
Registered electors		28,843		19.26%
MPP gain from FPM		Swing	15.64%	

=== 2002 Assembly election ===
2002 Manipur Legislative Assembly election: Khurai
Party	Candidate	Votes	%	±%
FPM	Ngairangbam Bijoy Singh	7,417	34.75%	
CPI	Laishram Sotinkumar	6,120	28.67%	9.44%
INC	Thoidingjam Jogimohon	5,014	23.49%	
BJP	Takhellambam Babu Singh	2,017	9.45%	3.42%
MSCP	Chandam Manihar	456	2.14%	−37.18%
JD(U)	Atomba Ngairangbamcha	319	1.49%	
Margin of victory		1,297	6.08%	−12.30%
Turnout		21,343	88.25%	−5.05%
Registered electors		24,184		3.55%
FPM gain from MSCP		Swing	6.48%	

=== 2000 Assembly election ===
2000 Manipur Legislative Assembly election: Khurai
Party	Candidate	Votes	%	±%
MSCP	Ngairangbam Bijoy Singh	8,372	39.32%	
MPP	Thoidingjam Jogimohon	4,459	20.94%	10.53%
CPI	Laishram Sotinkumar	4,095	19.23%	−6.18%
JD(S)	Ningombam Dhiren Singh	2,901	13.62%	
BJP	Ningombam Ibohal Singh	1,283	6.03%	1.69%
SAP	Atomba Ngairangbamcha	148	0.70%	
Margin of victory		3,913	18.38%	15.52%
Turnout		21,292	91.92%	−1.38%
Registered electors		23,356		11.60%
MSCP gain from Independent		Swing	11.05%	

=== 1995 Assembly election ===
1995 Manipur Legislative Assembly election: Khurai
Party	Candidate	Votes	%	±%
Independent	Ngairangbam Bijoy Singh	5,452	28.27%	
CPI	Laishram Sotinkumar	4,901	25.41%	5.77%
INC	Atomba Ngairangbamcha	3,043	15.78%	4.61%
JD	Ningombam Dhiren Singh	2,910	15.09%	
MPP	Chandam Manihar	2,007	10.41%	−24.23%
BJP	Ningombam Ibohal Singh	836	4.34%	
Margin of victory		551	2.86%	−1.49%
Turnout		19,284	93.31%	5.47%
Registered electors		20,929		3.54%
Independent gain from MPP		Swing	-6.37%	

=== 1990 Assembly election ===
1990 Manipur Legislative Assembly election: Khurai
Party	Candidate	Votes	%	±%
MPP	Chandam Manihar	6,111	34.64%	21.22%
INS(SCS)	Atomba Ngairangbamcha	5,344	30.29%	
CPI	Laishram Sotinkumar	3,466	19.65%	5.61%
INC	Niagthoujam Radhamuhon	1,971	11.17%	−5.17%
JD	Lairenlakpam Ibungobi Singh	642	3.64%	
Margin of victory		767	4.35%	−2.63%
Turnout		17,641	87.83%	1.39%
Registered electors		20,213		18.79%
MPP gain from Independent		Swing	11.32%	

=== 1984 Assembly election ===
1984 Manipur Legislative Assembly election: Khurai
Party	Candidate	Votes	%	±%
Independent	Atomba Ngairangbamcha	3,345	23.32%	
INC	Niagthoujam Radhamuhon	2,344	16.34%	
CPI	Laishram Sotinkumar	2,014	14.04%	−6.11%
Independent	Hijam Jugeshwor	1,963	13.68%	
MPP	Chandam Manihar	1,926	13.43%	−9.32%
Independent	Ningombam Ibohal Singh	1,822	12.70%	
Independent	Koijam Kulachandra	318	2.22%	
Independent	Yumnam Gourababu	250	1.74%	
IC(S)	Konsam Bhagirath	186	1.30%	
Independent	Apollos Lungleng	178	1.24%	
Margin of victory		1,001	6.98%	5.34%
Turnout		14,346	86.45%	5.84%
Registered electors		17,016		17.41%
Independent gain from MPP		Swing	0.57%	

=== 1980 Assembly election ===
1980 Manipur Legislative Assembly election: Khurai
Party	Candidate	Votes	%	±%
MPP	Chandam Manihar	2,577	22.74%	−3.70%
INC(I)	Atomba Ngairangbamcha	2,392	21.11%	
CPI	Laishram Sotinkumar	2,283	20.15%	
Independent	Ningombam Ibohal Singh	1,190	10.50%	
Independent	K. Bathakur Sharma	989	8.73%	
JP	Hijam Jugeshwar	924	8.16%	
INC(U)	Thongam Notrajit Singh	429	3.79%	
Independent	Apollos Lungleng	427	3.77%	
JP(S)	R. K. Thambalsana	119	1.05%	
Margin of victory		185	1.63%	−5.13%
Turnout		11,330	80.60%	−5.46%
Registered electors		14,493		21.85%
MPP gain from Socialist Labour Party (India)		Swing	-10.83%	

=== 1974 Assembly election ===
1974 Manipur Legislative Assembly election: Khurai
Party	Candidate	Votes	%	±%
Socialist Labour Party (India)	Kongbrailakpam Borthakur Sharma	3,362	33.58%	
INC	Atomba Ngairangbamcha	2,685	26.82%	2.69%
MPP	Chandam Manihar	2,648	26.45%	
Independent	Khagokpam Tomba Singh	1,317	13.15%	
Margin of victory		677	6.76%	6.26%
Turnout		10,012	86.07%	10.84%
Registered electors		11,894		10.64%
Socialist Labour Party (India) gain from INC(O)		Swing	8.01%	

=== 1972 Assembly election ===
1972 Manipur Legislative Assembly election: Khurai
Party	Candidate	Votes	%	±%
INC(O)	Atomba Ngairangbamcha	2,027	25.57%	
Socialist Labour Party (India)	K. Bathakur Sharma	1,987	25.06%	
INC	Khagokpam Tomba Singh	1,913	24.13%	−7.11%
CPI	Moirangthem Ibohal	1,289	16.26%	
Independent	Yumkham Irabot Singh	712	8.98%	
Margin of victory		40	0.50%	−5.85%
Turnout		7,928	75.23%	−3.64%
Registered electors		10,750		−32.33%
INC(O) gain from SSP		Swing	-12.03%	

=== 1967 Assembly election ===
1967 Manipur Legislative Assembly election: Khurai
Party	Candidate	Votes	%	±%
SSP	K. Bathakur Sharma	4,482	37.60%	
INC	R. U. Singh	3,724	31.24%	
Independent	N. T. Singh	2,341	19.64%	
Independent	L. I. Singh	839	7.04%	
CPI(M)	K. I. Singh	359	3.01%	
Independent	N. M. Singh	175	1.47%	
Margin of victory		758	6.36%	
Turnout		11,920	78.87%	
Registered electors		15,887		
SSP win (new seat)				

== See also ==
- List of constituencies of the Manipur Legislative Assembly
- Imphal East district
