= Torban (Khetri Leikai) =

- Census town
- Location in Manipur, India Torban (India)
- Coordinates: 24.774908°N 93.947565°E
- Country: India
- State: Manipur
- District: Imphal East

Population (2001)
  - Total: 4,553

Languages
  - Official: Meiteilon (Manipuri)
- Time zone: UTC+5:30 (IST)
- Vehicle registration: MN
- Website: manipur.gov.in

Torban (Khetri Leikai) is a census town in Imphal East district in the Indian state of Manipur.

== Demographics ==
As of 2001 India census, Torban (Khetri Leikai) had a population of 4553. Males constitute 48% of the population and females 52%. Torban (Khetri Leikai) has an average literacy rate of 83%, higher than the national average of 59.5%: male literacy is 90%, and female literacy is 76%. In Torban (Khetri Leikai), 9% of the population is under 6 years of age.
