= Lamlai =

Lamlai Lamlai
- Town
- Location in Manipur, India Lamlai (India)
- Coordinates: 24.86697°N 94.07548°E
- Country: India
- State: Manipur
- District: Imphal East
- Sub-district: Sawombung

Population (2001)
  - Total: 4,077

Languages
  - Official: Meitei
- Time zone: UTC+5:30 (IST)
- Postal code: 795010
- Vehicle registration: MN
- Website: manipur.gov.in

Lamlai is a town, governed by a Municipal Council, in the Imphal East district of Manipur state of India.

== Demographics ==
As of 2001 India census, Lamlai had a population of 4077. Males constitute 51% of the population and females 49%. Lamlai has an average literacy rate of 66%, higher than the national average of 59.5%: male literacy is 74%, and female literacy is 57%. In Lamlai, 13% of the population is under 6 years of age.
