= Khongman =

- Census town
- Location in Manipur, India Khongman (India)
- Coordinates: 24.77775°N 93.96022°E
- Country: India
- State: Manipur
- District: Imphal East

Population (2001)
  - Total: 5,465

Languages
  - Official: Meiteilon (Manipuri)
- Time zone: UTC+5:30 (IST)
- Vehicle registration: MN
- Website: manipur.gov.in

Khongman is a census town in Imphal East district in the Indian state of Manipur.

== Demographics ==
As of 2001 India census, Khongman had a population of 5465. Males constitute 48% of the population and females 52%. Khongman has an average literacy rate of 76%, higher than the national average of 59.5%: male literacy is 83%, and female literacy is 69%. In Khongman, 9% of the population is under 6 years of age.
