= Keikhu =

- town
- Location in Manipur, India Keikhu (India)
- Coordinates: 24°47′26″N 93°58′15″E
- Country: India
- State: Manipur

Languages
  - Official: Meiteilon (Manipuri)
- Time zone: UTC+5:30 (IST)
- Vehicle registration: MN
- Website: manipur.gov.in

Keikhu (also known as Keikhoo) is a village, itself consisting of two twin villages, in the Imphal East district of Manipur, India. The village in the south, known as Keikhu Kabui, is inhabited by the Kabui tribes, the early settlers of the place. The one in the north, known as Keikhu Muslim, belongs to a mixed tribe who identifies themselves as Pangal, a collective term used for Manipuri-Muslims.

== Geography ==
The villages are located approximately 2 km ESE of Imphal, the capital of the state of Manipur. The village lies along the Baruni hill, visited by Hindus as a ritual during the festival celebrating Shiva. The two villages are geographically divided by a rivulet. The village suffered from destructive flooding in 2010.

== Demographics ==
The two villages of Keikhu belong to under-represented minorities in the state. One is inhabited by Kabuis, a Schedule Tribe, and the other by Pangals, a Scheduled Caste. The Keikhu-Kabuis speak the Kabui Naga language, while the Keikhu-Pangal speak the Pangal dialect of Meiteilon.

== Ethnic conflict ==
There have been violent confrontations between the two communities from at least 1993 to 2023, as well as calls for peace from community groups and leaders. A camp was set up in Keikhu for displaced victims of wider ethnic conflict in the region.

== Community and events ==
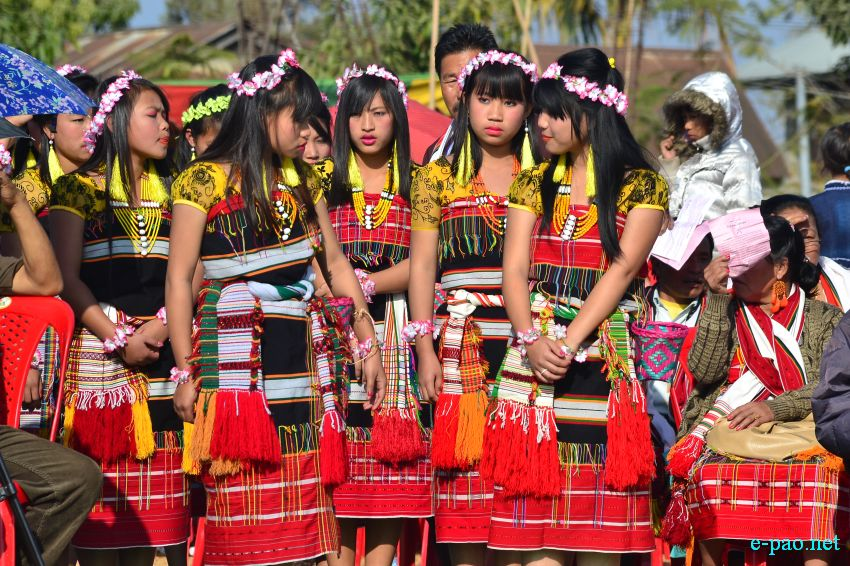
Gaan-Ngai 2014 at Keikhu Kabui Village

Keikhu hosts large annual Gaan-Ngai celebrations.
