= Heingang Assembly constituency =

Legislative Assembly constituency in Manipur State, India

Coordinates: 24.84°N 93.94°E

Heingang Assembly Constituency
- Constituency No. 2 for the Manipur Legislative Assembly
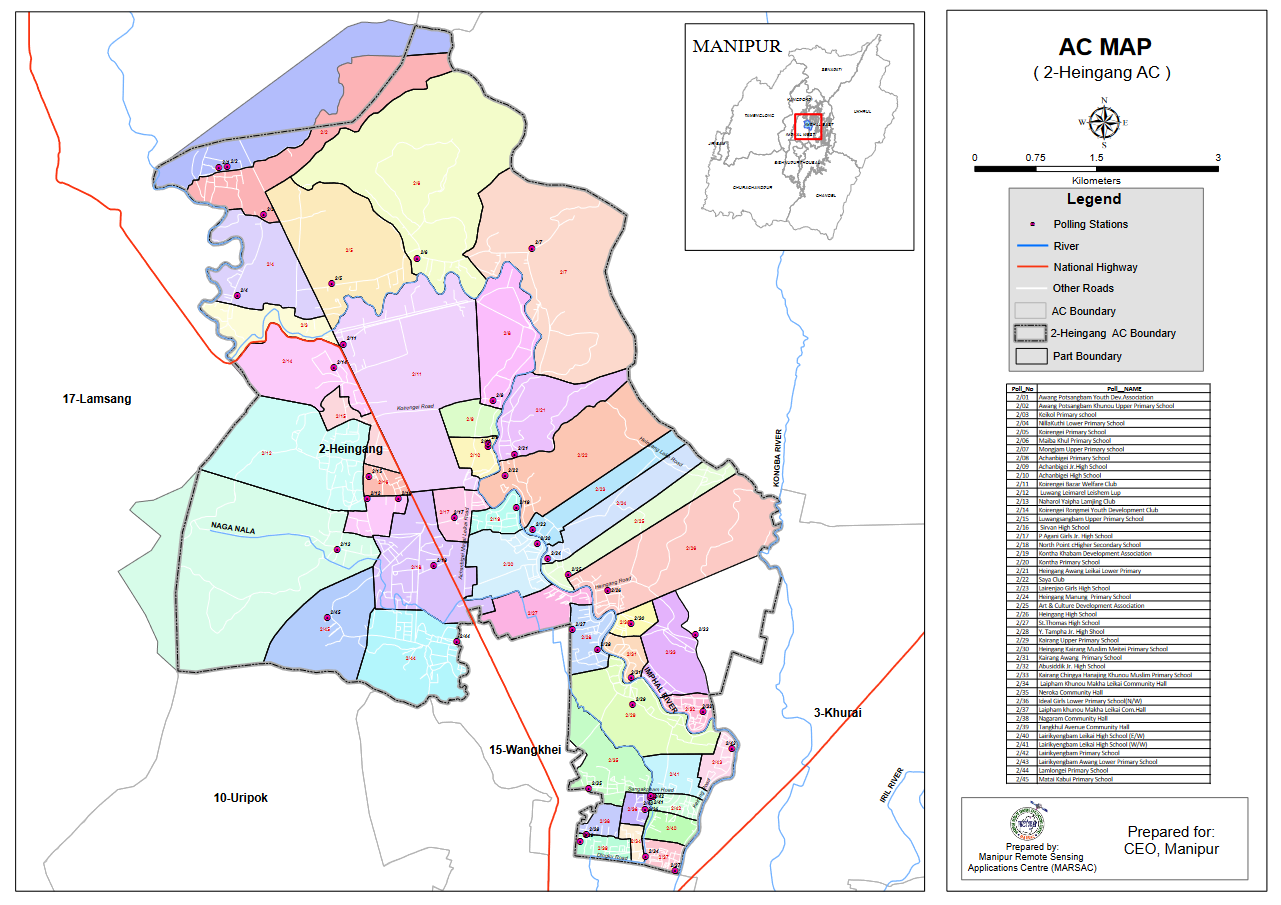

Constituency details
- Country: India
- Region: Northeast India
- State: Manipur
- District: Imphal East
- Lok Sabha constituency: Inner Manipur
- Established: 1974
- Total electors: 34,177
- Reservation: None

Member of Legislative Assembly
- 12th Manipur Legislative Assembly
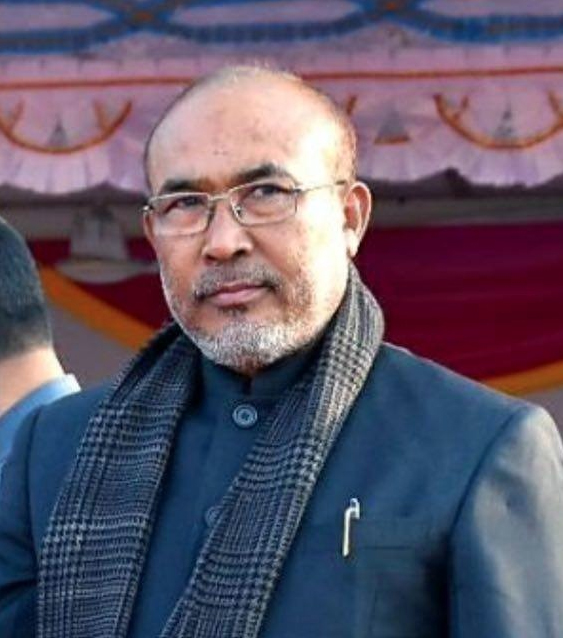
- Incumbent N. Biren Singh
- Elected year: 2022 Manipur Legislative Assembly election

Heingang Assembly Constituency is one of the 60 Vidhan Sabha constituencies in the Indian state of Manipur. Chief minister of state represents this constituency.

== Extent ==
Heingang is the 2nd of the 60 Assembly constituencies of Manipur, and has 45 parts, namely: 1-Awang Potsangbam Khunou Maning Leikai, 2-Awang Potsangbam Khunou Mamang Leikai, 3-Keikol, 4-Nillakuthi, 5-Koirengei, 6-Maiba Khul, 7-Mongjam, 8-Achanbigei Awang Leikai, 9-Achanbigei Mayai Leikai (A), 10-Achanbigei Mayai Leikai (B), 11-Koirengei Bazar, 12-Luwangshangbam Makha Leikai, 13-Matai, 14-Koirengei Kabui Khul, 15-Luwangsangbam Awang Leikai, 16. Luwangsangbam Mamang Leikai, 17-Kontha Khabam, 18-Kontha Khabam Lamkhai, 19-Kontha Khabam Mamang Leikai, 20-Kontha Khabam Mayai Leikai, 21-Heingang Awang Leikai, 22-Heingang Awang Leikai Saya Lampak, 23-Heingang Mayai Leikai (A), 24-Heingang Mayai Leikai (B), 25-Heingang Makha Panthoibi Leikai, 26-Heingang Makha Leikai, 27-Kontha Ahallup Awang Leikai, 28-Kontha Ahallup Makha Leikai, 29-Kairang Meitei, 30-Kairang Muslim Awang Leikai, 31-Kairang Muslim Mayai Leikai, 32-Kairang Muslim Mamang Leikai, 33-Kairang Khunou Chingya Leikai, 34-Laipham Khunou Awang Leikai, 35-Laipham Khunou Maning Leikai, 36-Laipham Khunou Mamang Leikai, 37-Laipham Khunou Makha Leikai, 38-Laipham Khunou Nagaram, 39-Laipham Khunou Tangkhul Avenue, 40-Lairikyengbam Makha Leikai, 41-Lairikyengbam Mayai Leikai (A), 42-Lairikyengbam Mayai Leikai (B), 43-Lairikyengbam Awang Leikai, 44-Lamlongei, and 45-Pantilong.

== Members of Legislative Assembly ==
Year	Member	Party
1974	Nongthombam Chaoba Singhk	Independent
1978	L. N. Singh	Independent
1980	Waikhom Jagor	Independent
1984	Waikhom Jagor	Indian National Congress
1995	Wakambam Thoiba Singh	Federal Party of Manipur
2000	Wakambam Thoiba Singh	Federal Party of Manipur
2002	Nongthombam Biren Singh	Democratic Revolutionary Peoples Party
2007	Nongthombam Biren Singh	Indian National Congress
2012	Nongthombam Biren Singh	Indian National Congress
2017	Nongthombam Biren Singh	Bharatiya Janata Party
2022	Nongthombam Biren Singh	Bharatiya Janata Party
2027		TBA

== Election results ==
Vote share of winning candidates
2022	78.54%
2017	38.11%
2012	51.49%
2007	45.66%
2002	29.06%
2000	31.51%
1995	33.81%
1984	28.59%
1980	29.00%
1974	41.40%

=== 2027 Assembly election ===
2027 Manipur Legislative Assembly election: Heingang
Party	Candidate	Votes	%	±%
BJP	N. Biren Singh			
INC				
NOTA	None of the above			
Majority				
Turnout				
gain from		Swing		

=== 2022 Assembly election ===
2022 Manipur Legislative Assembly election: Heingang
Party	Candidate	Votes	%	±%
BJP	N. Biren Singh	24,814	78.54	40.43
INC	Pangeijam Saratchandra Singh	6,543	20.71	−6.05
NOTA	Nota	239	0.76	
Margin of victory		18,271	57.83	53.42
Turnout		31,596	92.45	2.51
Registered electors		34,177		12.21
BJP hold		Swing	40.43	

=== 2017 Assembly election ===
2017 Manipur Legislative Assembly election: Heingang
Party	Candidate	Votes	%	±%
BJP	N. Biren Singh	10,439	38.11	
AITC	Pangeijam Saratchandra Singh	9,233	33.70	
INC	Naoroibam Ratan Meetei (Kapu)	7,329	26.75	−24.74
Margin of victory		1,206	4.40	−4.63
Turnout		27,394	89.94	3.56
Registered electors		30,459		14.10
BJP gain from INC		Swing	-13.38	

=== 2012 Assembly election ===
2012 Manipur Legislative Assembly election: Heingang
Party	Candidate	Votes	%	±%
INC	N. Biren	11,872	51.49	5.82
NCP	Naoroibam Ratan (Kapu) Meetei	9,790	42.46	
MPP	Y. Mangi	604	2.62	−25.87
AITC	L. Brojendro	415	1.80	
Manipur Democratic Peoples's Front	Dr. G. Tonsana Sharma	373	1.62	
Margin of victory		2,082	9.03	−8.14
Turnout		23,057	86.36	−0.36
Registered electors		26,694		−1.16
INC hold		Swing	5.82	

=== 2007 Assembly election ===
2007 Manipur Legislative Assembly election: Heingang
Party	Candidate	Votes	%	±%
INC	N. Biren Singh	10,697	45.66	26.21
MPP	Mutum Babita Devi	6,674	28.49	
MSCP	Yanglem Mangi Singh	5,660	24.16	−3.67
RJD	Wakambam Thoiba	163	0.70	
BJP	L. Basantakumar	151	0.64	−3.60
Margin of victory		4,023	17.17	15.95
Turnout		23,425	86.74	−2.26
Registered electors		27,007		18.21
INC gain from DRPP		Swing	16.60	

=== 2002 Assembly election ===
2002 Manipur Legislative Assembly election: Heingang
Party	Candidate	Votes	%	±%
DRPP	N. Biren Singh	5,869	29.06	
MSCP	Yanglem Mangi Singh	5,621	27.84	−2.75
INC	Waikhom Jagor Singh	3,928	19.45	17.48
FPM	Dr. Wakambam Thoiba Singh	3,852	19.07	
BJP	Thongam Angoton Singh	858	4.25	−17.12
Margin of victory		248	1.23	0.30
Turnout		20,194	89.00	−4.01
Registered electors		22,847		14.23
DRPP gain from FPM		Swing	-4.75	

=== 2000 Assembly election ===
2000 Manipur Legislative Assembly election: Heingang
Party	Candidate	Votes	%	±%
FPM	Dr. Wakambam Thoiba	6,250	31.51	
MSCP	Yanglem Mangi Singh	6,066	30.59	
BJP	Thongam Angoton Singh	4,238	21.37	
MPP	Longjam Ningthemjao	2,628	13.25	9.11
INC	Dr. Irengbam Kumar Singh	390	1.97	−15.98
NCP	Yungkham Ratimanjuri Devi	261	1.32	
Margin of victory		184	0.93	−12.64
Turnout		19,833	110.04	17.03
Registered electors		20,001		−0.12
FPM hold		Swing	-2.30	

=== 1995 Assembly election ===
1995 Manipur Legislative Assembly election: Heingang
Party	Candidate	Votes	%	±%
FPM	Wakambam Thoiba	6,225	33.81	
Independent	Yanglem Mangi Singh	3,727	20.24	
SJP(R)	Thongam Angoton	3,712	20.16	
INC	Waikhom Jagor Singh	3,304	17.95	
MPP	Chingakham Iboyaima Singh	762	4.14	
JD	Yengkokpam Priyokumar Singh	519	2.82	
JP	Akham Birdhaja Singh	100	0.54	
Margin of victory		2,498	13.57	
Turnout		18,411	93.01	
Registered electors		20,025		
FPM win (new seat)				

=== 1984 Assembly election ===
1984 Manipur Legislative Assembly election: Heingang
Party	Candidate	Votes	%	±%
INC	Waikhom Jagor Singh	3,795	28.59	
MPP	Thoudam Kumar	2,967	22.35	2.94
Independent	Longjam Ningthemjao	2,579	19.43	
Independent	Aribam Bimola Devi	1,608	12.11	
Independent	Nandeibam Babu	657	4.95	
Independent	Gurumayum Bijoychandra	636	4.79	
CPI	Naoroibam Chaoba	559	4.21	
Independent	Irengbam Kumar	287	2.16	
Independent	Yumkham Gourachandra	96	0.72	
Independent	N. Biren Singh	91	0.69	
Margin of victory		828	6.24	−2.33
Turnout		13,275	88.66	3.10
Registered electors		15,274		9.68
INC gain from Independent		Swing	-0.41	

=== 1980 Assembly election ===
1980 Manipur Legislative Assembly election: Heingang
Party	Candidate	Votes	%	±%
Independent	Waikhom Jagor Singh	3,388	29.00	
INC(I)	Longjan Ningthemjao	2,387	20.43	
MPP	Thoudam Kumar	2,268	19.41	−9.25
JP	Aribam Bimola Devi	1,947	16.67	
Independent	Yanglem Mangi Singh	1,300	11.13	
INC(U)	Lairikyengbam Gourachandra Roy	230	1.97	
JP(S)	Yanglom Ibotombi	162	1.39	
Margin of victory		1,001	8.57	−4.17
Turnout		11,682	85.56	−3.45
Registered electors		13,926		22.63
Independent hold		Swing	-12.40	

=== 1974 Assembly election ===
1974 Manipur Legislative Assembly election: Heingang
Party	Candidate	Votes	%	±%
Independent	Nongthombam Chaoba Singh	4,129	41.40	
MPP	Aribam Bimala Devi	2,859	28.67	
INC	Thouchom Kunjo Singh	2,360	23.66	
Independent	Lairellakpam Chandra	271	2.72	
INC(O)	Chanamthabam Goureshore	196	1.97	
Socialist Labour Party (India)	Yumkham Gourachandra	158	1.58	
Margin of victory		1,270	12.73	
Turnout		9,973	89.01	
Registered electors		11,356		
Independent win (new seat)				

== See also ==
- Manipur Legislative Assembly
- List of constituencies of Manipur Legislative Assembly
- Imphal East district
