= Nandeibam =

Coordinates: 24.739°N 93.944°E

Nandeibam is a small region at the west bank of Kongba river, running about 1 km south of Kongba Market, Imphal East District, Manipur, India. It has a population of a few hundred and is divided into two regions - the Nandeibam Leikai and the Kongba Makha Nandeibam Leikai. Nandeibam is a family name associated with the indigenous people of Manipur.
