= Leishangthem Susindro Meitei =

Politician from Manipur, India

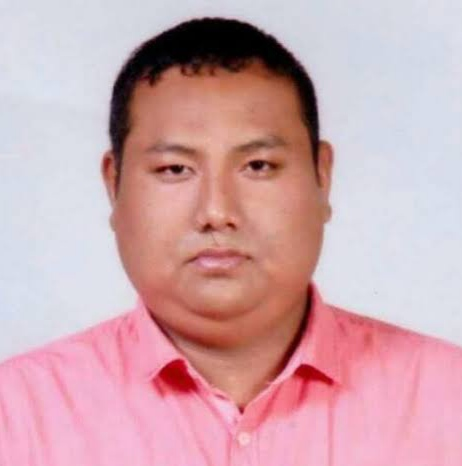
- L. Susindro Meitei

Member of the Manipur Legislative Assembly
- Incumbent
- Assumed office 2017
- Preceded by: Ngairangbam Bijoy Singh
- Constituency: Khurai

Minister of Public Health Engineering Department, Consumer Affairs, Food & Public Distribution Department
- In office 2022–2025

Personal details
- Party: Bharatiya Janata Party

Leishangthem Susindro Meitei is an Indian politician and member of the Bharatiya Janata Party. He is a member of the Manipur Legislative Assembly, representing the Khurai constituency. On 16 April 2022, he was sworn in as the Minister of Public Health Engineering Department, Consumer Affairs, Food & Public Distribution Department in the Second N. Biren Singh ministry.

In October 2022, Susindro gave monetary assistance of 20,000 INR to the religious committee that manages the shrine of the Meitei goddess Ima Ujao Lairembi in Adampur Konagao, to help with organizing the Lai Haraoba in Bangladesh. It was during his visit to meet the Meitei people in Bangladesh during their festival Ningol Chakkouba, as he was sent by Nongthombam Biren Singh, the then Chief Minister of Manipur.
