= Ngairangbam Bijoy Singh =

Indian politician and medical doctor

Dr. Ngairangbam Bijoy Singh (born 1 March 1946 in Imphal) is a medical doctor and politician from Manipur, India. He studied medicine in Guwahati and urology in Manchester, UK. He was appointed director of the Regional Institute of Medical Sciences, Imphal in June 1996. In 2003, he became Vice-Chancellor of Manipur University. In 2007 he was elected to the Legislative Assembly of Manipur, as the Manipur People's Party candidate from the Khurai constituency.
