= Huikap =

- village
- Location in Manipur, India
- Coordinates: 24.710°N 94.024°E
- Country: India
- State: Manipur
- District: Imphal East

Population (2001)
  - Total: 2,223

Languages
  - Official: Meiteilon (Manipuri)
- Time zone: UTC+5:30 (IST)
- PIN: 795149
- Vehicle registration: MN
- Website: manipur.gov.in

Huikap is a village in the Imphal East district of Manipur, India. It is a part of Andro Assembly constituency. It belongs to Tulihal Zila Parishad and Angtha Gram Panchayat. It is Village number 19 of Keirao Bitra sub-division of Imphal East district, Manipur.

== Religion ==
People of Huikap follow Hinduism and Meiteism. Since 1981, some people found embracing faith to Christianity, so there is a small population of Christians in the village. Two well known Meitei Christian missionaries who came out of this small village are Rev.Dr.Thiyam Shyamjai, and (L) Sarat Sanasam.

== Huikap Ningthou ==
One of the most striking feature of Huikap is the mode of worship in the village. This feature is different from other villages of Manipur.

The village deity of Huikap is Huikap Ningthou. In various villages of Manipur, the local deity is called upon as either 'Lainingthou', 'Lairembi', etc. But, Huikap Ningthou should be called 'Ipa Ibungo Huikap Ningthou' (My Father Huikap Ningthou).

There is a sacred grove for the local deity. People throng every year in the first week of May to offer prayer to the Father during Huikap Ningthou Laiching Kaaba event. The event is celebrated in much pomp and show. Women of Huikap who were married to other parts of the state/country return home during this day to worship the deity.

At the end of the ceremony, a mukna tournament takes place.

Local people offer pig and chicken as a mark of respect to the protector of the village.

== Transport and communication ==
Huikap village is 18 km from Imphal. The village is connected to this capital city by village road and town road. Means of transport and communication is excellent. Huikap village has access to drinking water and electricity as well.

== Education ==
Though there is no official record, Huikap village has a good literacy rate. There are two schools - (a) Huikap High School and (b) Evergreen English School.

Some of the noted scholars of Huikap village include: Khumujam Bijoy Singh, Chongtham Nimaichand Singh, Thangjam Sajouba Singh, and Dr. Thiyam Shyamjai. There are few young people who are in central services, both civil and defense.
