= Porompat =

Porompat (Old Manipuri: Polompat)
- Census town
- Location within Manipur Location within India
- Coordinates: 24°48′47.469″N 93°57′53.274″E
- Country: India
- State: Manipur
- District: Imphal East

Population (2011)
  - Total: 6,191

Language(s)
  - Official: Meitei (officially called Manipuri)
- Time zone: UTC+5:30 (IST)
- PIN: 795005
- Vehicle registration: MN
- Website: manipur.gov.in

Porompat (Meitei pronunciation: /pō-rōm-pāt/) is a census town in Imphal East district in the Indian state of Manipur.

== Demographics ==
As of 2001 India census, Porompat had a population of 5163. Males constitute 49% of the population and females 51%. Porompat has an average literacy rate of 71%, higher than the national average of 59.5%: male literacy is 80%, and female literacy is 61%. In Porompat, 12% of the population is under 6 years of age.
