= Imphal East district =

- District of Manipur
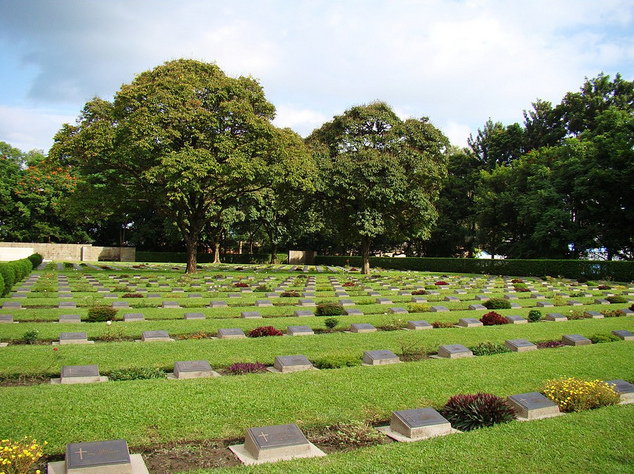
- Imphal War Cemetery

- Location in Manipur
- Coordinates: 24°48′N 93°57′E
- Country: India
- State: Manipur
- Named for: region of Imphal in the eastern side of the Imphal River
- Headquarters: Porompat

Area
  - Total: 497 km^{2} (192 sq mi)
  - Rank: 13

Population (2011)
  - Total: 412,275
  - Density: 830/km^{2} (2,150/sq mi)

Language(s)
  - Official: Meiteilon (officially called Manipuri)
  - Regional: Imphal dialect
- Time zone: UTC+5:30 (IST)
- ISO 3166 code: IN-MN-EI
- Vehicle registration: MN
- Website: imphaleast.nic.in

Imphal East district (Meitei pronunciation: /ˈɪmfəl or ɪmˈfɑːl/) is one of the 16 districts of Manipur state in northeastern India. In 2011, it was the second most populous district in the state, after Imphal West. In 2016, the Jiribam subdivision, which was an exclave at the western periphery of the state, was separated as an independent district. The Imphal dialect is the standard dialect of Meitei language, officially known as Manipuri language, and is natively used in the region.

== Description ==
The Imphal East district occupies the northeastern part of the Imphal Valley. It was created in June 1997 by dividing the erstwhile Imphal district into two parts. Prior to that, it was a subdivision of the Imphal district. The hill territory of Jiribam, which was attached to the Impal East district since its formation, was separated into its own district in 2016 as part of a major reorganisation of districts. At the same time, several hilly regions in the interior of Imphal East associated with Senapati district, were included in Imphal East.

A major part of the Imphal city urban agglomeration is included in Imphal West, the rest being in Imphal East. Roughly half the population of Imphal East lives in the urban area.

The district headquarters of Imphal East is at Porompat. The total area of the district, prior to the 2016 reorganisation, was approximately 497 km^{2}. The district is situated at an altitude 790 metres above the M.S. Level. The climate of the district is salubrious and the monsoon is tropical. The minimum temperature goes down to 0.6 degree Celsius in the winter and 41 degree Celsius in the summer. It has no rail network and hence communication is entirely dependent on road. The district is connected via N.H. 39, N.H. 53 and N.H. 150.

== Demographics ==
=== Population ===
Historical population
Year	Pop.	±%
1951	89,821	—
1961	135,594	+51.0%
1971	189,713	+39.9%
1981	255,365	+34.6%
1991	330,460	+29.4%
2001	394,876	+19.5%
2011	456,113	+15.5%
2011 Imphal East district (including the Jiribam subdivision); Source: Census of India

Languages of Imphal East district (2011)
1. Manipuri (91.0%)
2. Nepali (1.66%)
3. Kabui (1.61%)
4. Tangkhul (1.02%)
5. Others (4.70%)
Religions in Imphal East district (2011)
1. Hinduism (61.5%)
2. Sanamahi (16.8%)
3. Islam (15.8%)
4. Christianity (5.22%)
5. Others (0.66%)

According to the 2011 census Imphal East district has a population of 456,113. This gives it a ranking of 551st in India (out of a total of 640). The district has a population density of 638 inhabitants per square kilometre (1,650/sq mi) . Its population growth rate over the decade 2001-2011 was 14.63%. Imphal East has a sex ratio of 1011 females for every 1000 males, and a literacy rate of 82.81%.

	Population	Percentage of Total Pop.
All Scheduled Tribes	27,657	6.1%
Kuki-Zo tribes (Note: The Kuki-Zo tribes include Gangte, Hmar, Paite, Simte, Sukte, Thadou, Vaiphei, Zou, and some smaller tribes designated as "Any Kuki" and "Any Lushai (Mizo)".)	10,737	2.4%
Naga tribes (Note: The Naga tribes include Angami, Kabui, Kacha Naga, Mao, Maram, Poumai, Sema and Tangkhul.)	12,902	2.8%
Old Kuki/Naga (Note: The Old Kuki tribes retaining the Kuki classification include: Aimol, Chiru, Kom, Koireng, Kharam, and Ralte. The tribes under the Naga umbrella include: Anal, Chothe, Koirao, Lamkang, Maring, Moyon, Monsang, Purum and Tarao.)	3,556	0.8%

After the separation of the Jiribam subdivision, the residual district has population 412,275. It has a sex ratio of 1023 females per 1000 males. 42.65% of the population live in urban areas. Scheduled Castes and Scheduled Tribes made up 2.04% and 5.38% of the population respectively.

=== Languages ===
As per 2011 census, the languages spoken in Imphal East district (excluding newly created Jiribam district) are Manipuri (375,207), Nepali (6,851), Kabui (6,622), Tangkhul (4,205), and Kuki (2,066).

== Administrative divisions ==
Sub Divisions	Tehsils/ SDC Circles
Porompat	Heingang, Porompat, Bashikhong
Keirao Bitra	Keirao Bitra, Tulihal
Sawombung	Sawombung, Sagolmang

Recently, Jiribam district is carved out from Imphal East district comprising sub-divisions of Jiribam, Borobekra, and Babukhal.

== Areas under Imphal Urban Agglomeration ==
- Porompat

== Economy ==
=== Agriculture ===
Agriculture is the main occupation of the people in the district. There are 27,000 and 4,100 hectares of land for H.Y.V. (High Yield Variety) and improved local paddy field respectively. There are 450 hectares of land for maize, 60 hectares for wheat and 350 hectares for potato. The main food crops are paddy, potato and vegetables. Among the cash crops are sugarcane, maize, pulse, oil seed and other vegetables. The total number of workers engaged in agriculture in the district was 42,473 as per the 1991 census of which 28,661 were males and 13,812 were females. Spices like chilli, onion, ginger, turmeric and coriander of good quality are grown in the district.

AREA & PRODUCTION OF IMPORTANT CROPS: (during 1998 -99 in Imphal East district)
Sl. No.	Name of Crops	Area in Hect.	Production in MT
KHARIF CROPS
1	Paddy (HYV)	27.00	80.14
2	Local paddy	4.10	5.44
3	Maize	0.45	0.80
4	Sugar cane	0.29	17.84
5	Kharif Pulse	0.22	0.26
RABI CROPS
1	Wheat	0.06	0.08
2	Pea & other pulses	1.53	1.09
3	Potato	0.35	1.52
4	Muster & other Oilseeds crops	0.60	1.22

==== Horticulture ====
Horticulture products have been acquiring popularity with the people in the district. Fruits like pineapple, banana, lemon and papaya grow well in the district. Pineapple grows in plenty at the slope of Ngariyan Hill. There is considerable scope for increasing the area under different horticulture crops. The soil and climate favour for mass plantation of horticulture products in the district.

The following is the areas and production of horticulture crops in the district during 1998-99.

Sl.No.	Crops	Area in Hectare	Annual production ( M.T.)
1	Pineapple	650	3,700
2	Banana	50	392
3	Lemon	56	224
4	Plum, Pear & Peach	30	180
5	Papaya	230	1,150
6	Mango	12	60
7	Guava	30	138
8	Others	250	397
Total		1,358	6,646

==== Livestock ====
In the district, there is a dairy farm and a veterinary training center. There are also 5 veterinary hospitals and 19 veterinary dispensaries along with three aids centers. The following is the population of livestock as per survey report of 1997 census.

Sl. No.	Category	Total Population
A	LIVESTOCK	
1	Cattle	85,964
2	Buffaloes	2,310
3	Sheep	461
4	Goats	2,189
5	Horses & Ponies	542
6	Pigs	10,563
7	Dogs	15,940
8	Rabbits	799
B	POULTRY	
1	Cock	30,719
2	Hen	2,37,704
3	Chicken (below three months)	1,60,018
4	Drakes	21,029
5	Ducks	35,832
6	Ducklings ( below six months )	21,512
7	Other fowls	5,784

=== Forest ===
The following is the information of forest products available in the district

OUTTURN VALUES OF MINOR FOREST PRODUCES OF CENTRAL FOREST DIVISION (IMPHAL EAST & IMPHAL WEST) FOR THE YEAR 1999–2000.
Sl.No.	Items	Units	Quantity	Value (in Rs.)
1	Firewood	M.T.	16.8	43.560
2	Bamboo	nil	nil	nil
3	Charcoal	Qtl.	1 80	
4	Earth	C.M.	1,060	16,620
5	Stone	C.M.	31,610	4,77,340
6	Sand	C.M.	23,542	3,29,685

=== Tourism ===
There are two motels in the district at Kaina and Jiribam. Shree-Shree Govindajee Temple, a golden temple is located in the palace compound area. There are two war cemeteries maintained by the British War Grave Commission. There is a temple at Kaina and it is a holy place of the Hindus. The Hanuman temple at Mahabali is a pre-historical place in the State.

Manipur is known for its scenic environment, landscapes, climate and cultural heritage, which has a great potential for development of tourism.

== Geography ==
Porompat town is the administrative headquarters of the district. Nandeibam is also in the district.

== Climate ==
Imphal

Climate chart (precipitation, max. and min. temperature)
J	F	M	A	M	J	J	A	S	O	N	D
13 21 4	31 23 7	61 27 11	101 29 15	146 29 18	284 29 21	231 29 22	197 29 21	124 29 20	120 28 17	36 25 10	10 22 5
- █ Average max. and min. temperatures in °C
- █ Precipitation totals in mm
- Source: IMD
Imperial conversion
J	F	M	A	M	J	J	A	S	O	N	D
0.5 70 39	1.2 74 44	2.4 81 51	4 84 60	5.7 84 65	11 84 69	9.1 84 71	7.7 84 70	4.9 84 68	4.7 82 62	1.4 77 51	0.4 72 41
- █ Average max. and min. temperatures in °F
- █ Precipitation totals in inches

== See also ==
- List of populated places in Imphal East district
- Huikap
- Keikhoo
