= 2000 Manipur Legislative Assembly election =

Legislative Assembly election in Manipur, India

- 12 and 22 February 2000

All 60 seats in the Manipur Legislative Assembly 31 seats needed for a majority
- Registered: 1,415,933
- Turnout: 89.87%

	Majority party	Minority party
Leader	Wahengbam Nipamacha Singh
Party	MSCP	INC
Leader's seat	Wangoi
Seats before	New	22
Seats won	23	11
Seat change	New	▼11
Popular vote	26.28%	18.31%
CM before election
Wahengbam Nipamacha Singh
MSCP
Elected CM
Wahengbam Nipamacha Singh
MSCP

Elections to the Manipur Legislative Assembly were held in February 2000, to elect members of the 60 constituencies in Manipur, India. The Manipur State Congress Party won the most seats as well as the popular vote, and Wahengbam Nipamacha Singh was re-appointed as the Chief Minister of Manipur.

After the passing of The Delimitation of Parliamentary and Assembly Constituencies Order, 1976, the constituencies were set to the ones used in this election.

== Parties contested ==
Party	Flag	Symbol	Leader	Seats contested
Manipur State Congress Party			Wahengbam Nipamacha Singh	57
Indian National Congress			Okram Ibobi Singh	47
Nationalist Congress Party			P. A. Sangma	41
Bharatiya Janata Party			L. K. Advani	39
Federal Party of Manipur			Gangmumei Kamei	39
Samata Party			George Fernandes	36
Manipur People's Party				29
Janata Dal (United)			Nitish Kumar	18
Rashtriya Janata Dal			Lalu Prasad Yadav	15
Communist Party of India			A. B. Bardhan	15
Janata Dal (Secular)			H. D. Deve Gowda	8
Communist Party of India (Marxist)			Prakash Karat	4
Revolutionary Socialist Party			T. J. Chandrachoodan	3
Kuki National Assembly				1
Nagaland People's Party				1

== Result ==
Party	Votes	%	Seats	+/–
Manipur State Congress Party	331,141	26.28	23	New
Indian National Congress	230,748	18.31	11	▼11
Bharatiya Janata Party	142,174	11.28	6	▲5
Federal Party of Manipur	118,916	9.44	6	▲4
Manipur Peoples Party	99,504	7.90	4	▼16
Nationalist Congress Party	99,128	7.87	5	New
Samata Party	84,215	6.68	1	▼2
Communist Party of India	45,309	3.60	0	▼2
Rashtriya Janata Dal	23,037	1.83	1	New
Janata Dal (United)	22,576	1.79	1	New
Janata Dal (Secular)	19,945	1.58	1	New
Communist Party of India (Marxist)	3,783	0.30	0	0
Revolutionary Socialist Party	1,050	0.08	0	New
Kuki National Assembly	690	0.05	0	0
Independents	37,875	3.01	1	▼2
Total	1,260,091	100.00	60	0
Valid votes	1,260,091	99.07		
Invalid/blank votes	11,849	0.93		
Total votes	1,271,940	100.00		
Registered voters/turnout	1,415,933	89.83		
Source: ECI

=== Results by constituency ===
Winner, runner-up, voter turnout, and victory margin in every constituency
#	Constituency	Turnout	Winner				Runner Up				Margin
#	Constituency	Turnout	Candidate	Party	Votes	%	Candidate	Party	Votes	%	Margin
1	Khundrakpam	114.72	Konsam Tomba	MPP	4,279	22.21	Lairellakpam Lala	MSCP	3,789	19.67	490
2	Heingang	110.04	Dr. Wakambam Thoiba	FPM	6,250	28.40	Yanglem Mangi Singh	MSCP	6,066	27.56	184
3	Khurai	91.92	Ngairangbam Bijoy Singh	MSCP	8,372	38.99	Thoidingjam Jogimohon	MPP	4,459	20.77	3,913
4	Kshetrigao	92.60	Basant Kumar Wangkhem	SAP	10,602	48.49	Md. Muhammuddin Shah	MSCP	7,249	33.15	3,353
5	Thongju	93.32	Dr. Sapam Dhananjoy	MSCP	5,790	27.65	Bijoy Koijam	IND	4,416	21.09	1,374
6	Keirao	96.39	Hidam Bidur Singh	MSCP	4,713	25.13	Th. Gerani Meitei	BJP	2,805	14.95	1,908
7	Andro	93.72	S. Chandra Singh	MPP	6,239	29.74	L. Amujao Singh	MSCP	3,607	17.19	2,632
8	Lamlai	87.21	Kshetrimayum Biren Singh	MSCP	6,148	33.62	Pheiroijam Parijat Singh	CPI	5,427	29.68	721
9	Thangmeiband	79.65	Radhabinod Koijam	INC	5,983	33.14	Meinam Bhorot Singh	BJP	5,120	28.36	863
10	Uripok	84.81	P. Achou Singh	MSCP	4,866	32.33	Laishram Nandakumar Singh	FPM	4,540	30.16	326
11	Sagolband	83.03	Dr. Khwairakpam Loken Singh	JD(S)	5,235	32.41	Moirangthem Kumar Singh	MSCP	4,598	28.47	637
12	Keishamthong	89.40	L. Bhagyachandra Singh	FPM	4,731	23.63	Mayengbam Ibotombi Singh	BJP	4,565	22.81	166
13	Singjamei	91.25	Haobam Bhubon Singh	BJP	8,277	52.28	Irengbam Hemochandra Singh	MSCP	7,006	44.25	1,271
14	Yaiskul	89.48	Rajkumar Dorendra Singh	BJP	9,798	51.09	Elangbam Kunjeswar Singh	MSCP	9,221	48.08	577
15	Wangkhei	84.78	Dr. Haobam Borobabu Singh	BJP	7,670	32.35	Yumkham Erabot Singh	INC	6,891	29.07	779
16	Sekmai	89.23	Khwairakpam Chandra	BJP	5,745	34.03	Ningthoujam Biren	MSCP	5,609	33.22	136
17	Lamsang	91.16	Sorokhaibam Rajen Singh	MSCP	6,840	33.85	Wangkheimayum Brajabidhu Singh	BJP	6,678	33.05	162
18	Konthoujam	93.64	Henam Lokhon Singh	MSCP	6,903	34.67	Nongmaithem Joykumar	CPI	4,798	24.10	2,105
19	Patsoi	86.77	Dr. Leishangthem Chandramani Singh	MSCP	7,882	38.12	Leishangthem Thoiren	CPI	4,206	20.34	3,676
20	Langthabal	93.25	O. Joy Singh	MPP	6,753	39.86	Karam Babudhon Singh	MSCP	6,518	38.48	235
21	Naoriya Pakhanglakpa	92.33	Wahengbam Leima Devi	IND	5,418	24.96	Akoijam Ibobi	SAP	3,716	17.12	1,702
22	Wangoi	94.68	Wahengbam Nipamacha Singh	MSCP	7,113	41.18	Yumnam Mani Singh	BJP	5,575	32.28	1,538
23	Mayang Imphal	94.21	Khumujam Amutombi Singh	INC	4,780	26.79	Meinam Nilchandra Singh	MSCP	4,685	26.26	95
24	Nambol	94.48	Thounaojam Bira Singh	MSCP	8,990	40.53	Nameirakpam Loken Singh	MPP	8,070	36.38	920
25	Oinam	89.39	Dr. Yumnam Jiten Singh	MSCP	8,752	48.01	Laishram Radhakishore Singh	NCP	5,388	29.56	3,364
26	Bishnupur	94.38	Govindas Konthoujam	MSCP	9,821	46.41	Ningthoujam Sanajaoba Singh	BJP	6,724	31.78	3,097
27	Moirang	90.97	Laishram Kerani Singh	INC	5,140	20.65	Salam Gopal Singh	FPM	4,771	19.17	369
28	Thanga	92.26	Heisnam Sanayaima Singh	MSCP	3,992	25.25	Haobijam Kangjamba Singh	BJP	3,936	24.90	56
29	Kumbi	89.10	Sanasam Bira	MSCP	4,777	25.48	Ningthoujam Mangi	CPI	4,698	25.05	79
30	Lilong	91.51	Alauddin	NCP	6,706	35.89	Dr. Md. Maniruddin Shaikh	INC	6,553	35.07	153
31	Thoubal	92.84	Leitanthem Tomba Singh	MSCP	7,527	37.28	Abdul Rouf	MPP	4,768	23.62	2,759
32	Wangkhem	93.48	Dr. Nimai Chand Luwang	INC	7,057	35.35	Dr. Ibochouba Longjam	SAP	3,985	19.96	3,072
33	Heirok	91.26	Moirangthem Okendro	INC	7,665	39.93	Nongmeikapam Komol Singh	BJP	5,956	31.03	1,709
34	Wangjing Tentha	92.61	Moirangthem Hemanta Singh	MSCP	7,288	34.69	Moirangthem Nara Singh	CPI	6,703	31.91	585
35	Khangabok	96.32	Laishram Jatra Singh	MPP	11,144	48.39	Okram Ibobi Singh	INC	11,092	48.16	52
36	Wabgai	94.99	Mayengbam Manihar Singh	INC	6,282	32.43	Md. Abdul Salam	MPP	4,066	20.99	2,216
37	Kakching	90.25	N. Nimai Singh	INC	5,398	29.23	Thokchom Tomba Singh	CPI	3,966	21.48	1,432
38	Hiyanglam	91.51	Maibam Kunjo Singh	MSCP	5,498	29.81	Elangbam Biramani Singh	MPP	3,774	20.46	1,724
39	Sugnu	92.22	Kangujam Ranjit Singh	BJP	5,204	27.04	Mayanglambam Babu Singh	MSCP	4,743	24.64	461
40	Jiribam	79.11	Ashangbam Biren	MSCP	10,911	58.80	Thoudam Debendra Singh	INC	5,438	29.31	5,473
41	Chandel	96.65	T.Hangkhanpau	RJD	13,187	38.79	B. D. Behring	MSCP	11,333	33.34	1,854
42	Tengnoupal	96.20	Onjamang Haokip	NCP	13,900	45.25	Wairok Morung Makunga	INC	10,018	32.61	3,882
43	Phungyar	69.37	Rishang Keishing	INC	4,539	30.65	Wungnaoshang Keishing	JD(U)	3,342	22.57	1,197
44	Ukhrul	73.95	Danny Shaiza	BJP	10,578	49.97	A. S. Arthur	INC	4,549	21.49	6,029
45	Chingai	56.72	Dr. Khashim Ruivah	FPM	3,950	22.88	R. N. Chihanpam	BJP	3,290	19.05	660
46	Saikul	90.84	Chungkhokai Doungel	NCP	14,746	54.49	Johnson Keishing	FPM	3,841	14.19	10,905
47	Karong	95.21	L. Jonathan	INC	11,210	28.02	P. S. Henry Paotei	FPM	9,575	23.93	1,635
48	Mao	92.49	M. Thohrii	INC	23,149	58.74	Soso Lorho	MSCP	13,813	35.05	9,336
49	Tadubi	95.75	K. Raina	FPM	7,903	23.78	Francis Ngajokpa	INC	7,802	23.47	101
50	Kangpokpi	92.13	Thangminlen Kipgen	NCP	14,565	62.60	Ranjit Gurung	INC	5,432	23.35	9,133
51	Saitu	96.21	Haokholet Kipgen	FPM	14,580	47.89	Ngamthang Haokip	MSCP	14,394	47.28	186
52	Tamei	93.05	Mangaibou	MSCP	9,506	42.43	Athuan Abonmei	FPM	3,926	17.52	5,580
53	Tamenglong	85.53	Samuel Jendai	MSCP	7,572	44.16	Khangthuanang Panmei	SAP	4,361	25.43	3,211
54	Nungba	88.39	Gangmumei Kamei	FPM	6,282	42.18	Gaikhangam Gangmei	INC	5,291	35.53	991
55	Tipaimukh	86.18	Ngursanglur	NCP	2,407	20.19	Dr. Chaltonlien Amo	INC	2,393	20.08	14
56	Thanlon	92.88	Songchinkhup	MSCP	8,864	57.42	C. Than	SAP	5,329	34.52	3,535
57	Henglep	92.47	T. Manga Vaiphei	INC	5,409	27.09	T. Thangzalam Haokip	MSCP	3,762	18.84	1,647
58	Churachandpur	84.39	V. Hangkhanlian	MSCP	15,666	49.99	T. Phungzathang	INC	14,818	47.29	848
59	Saikot	92.64	M. Chungkhosei Haokip	MSCP	9,286	28.91	T. N. Haokip	MPP	7,174	22.34	2,112
60	Singhat	92.97	N. Zatawn	JD(U)	6,450	31.96	T. Ngaizanem	SAP	5,066	25.10	1,384

== See also ==
- List of constituencies of the Manipur Legislative Assembly
- 2000 elections in India
