= 2007 Manipur Legislative Assembly election =

Legislative Assembly election in Manipur, India

← 2002	8–23 February 2007	2012 →

All 60 seats in the Manipur Legislative Assembly 31 seats needed for a majority
- Registered: 1,707,204
- Turnout: 86.73%
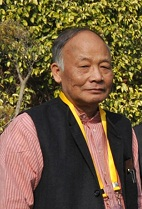

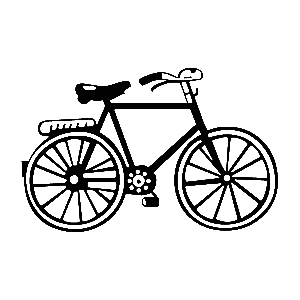

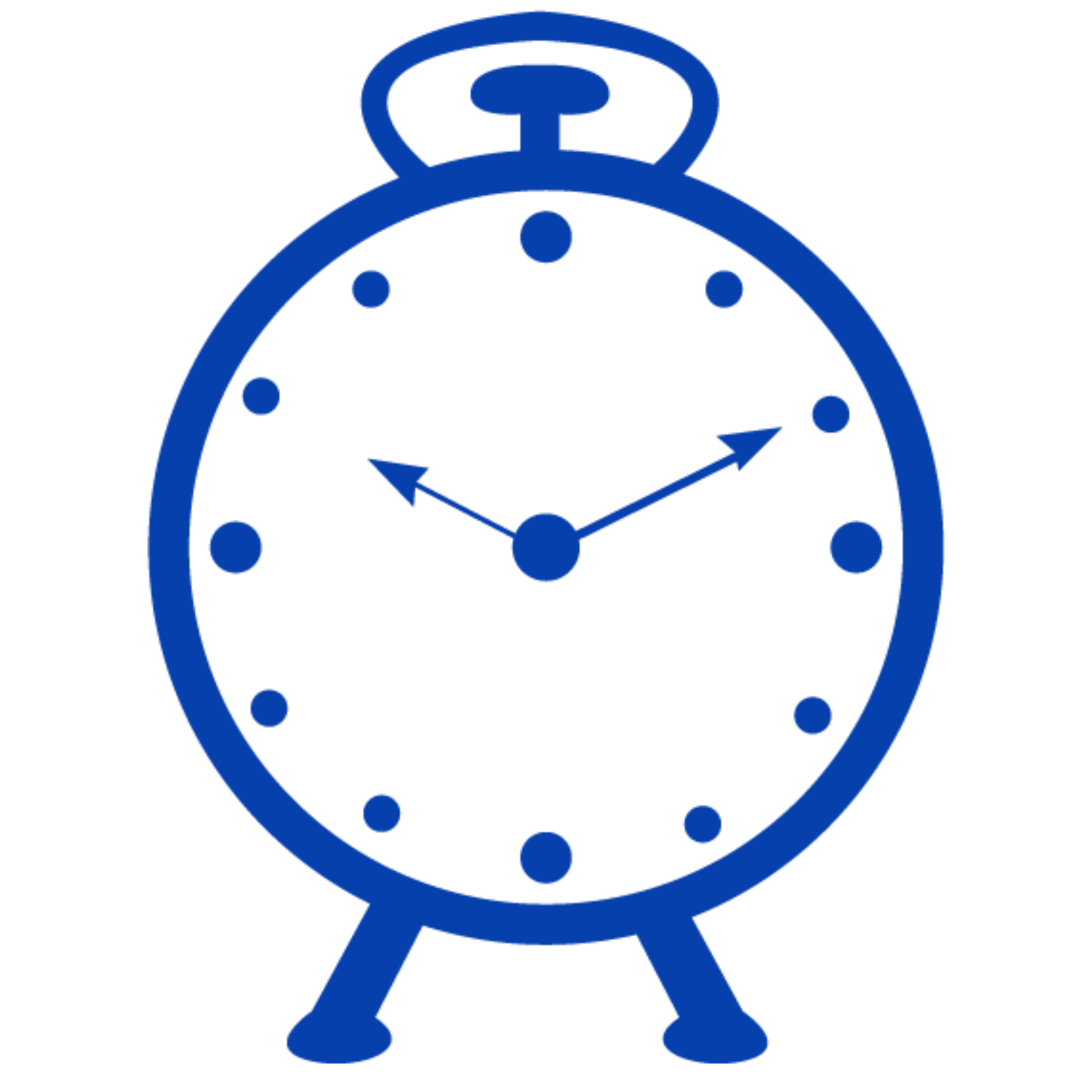
	Majority party	Minority party	Third party
Leader	Okram Ibobi Singh
Party	INC	MPP	NCP
Leader's seat	Khangabok
Seats before	20	2	3
Seats won	30	5	5
Seat change	▲10	▲3	▲2
Popular vote	34.30%	15.45%	8.58%
CM before election
Okram Ibobi Singh
INC
Elected CM
Okram Ibobi Singh
INC

Elections to the Manipur Legislative Assembly were held in February 2007, to elect members of the 60 constituencies in Manipur, India. The Indian National Congress won the most seats as well as the popular vote, and Okram Ibobi Singh was re-appointed as the Chief Minister of Manipur. The Indian National Congress was part of the Secular Proggresive Front alliance, along with the Communist Party of India, the Nationalist Congress Party and the Manipur State Congress Party.

After the passing of The Delimitation of Parliamentary and Assembly Constituencies Order, 1976, the constituencies were set to the ones used in this election.

== Parties contested ==
Party	Flag	Symbol	Leader	Seats contested
Indian National Congress			Okram Ibobi Singh	59
Manipur People's Party				36
Rashtriya Janata Dal			Lalu Prasad Yadav	28
Nationalist Congress Party			P. A. Sangma	27
Communist Party of India			A. B. Bardhan	24
Samajwadi Party			Mulayam Singh Yadav	20
Lok Janshakti Party			Ram Vilas Paswan	19
Bharatiya Janata Party			Rajnath Singh	14
Manipur State Congress Party			Wahengbam Nipamacha Singh	6
Nagaland People's Party				5
Samata Party			George Fernandes	4
Janata Dal (United)			Nitish Kumar	3
Janata Dal (Secular)			H. D. Deve Gowda	2
All India Forward Bloc			Debabrata Biswas	2
People's Democratic Alliance				1
Communist Party of India (Marxist)			Prakash Karat	1
Revolutionary Socialist Party			K. Pankajakshan	1
Naga National Party				1

== Result ==
Party	Votes	%	Seats	+/–
Indian National Congress	507,518	34.31	30	▲10
Manipur Peoples Party	279,862	18.92	8	▲6
Nationalist Congress Party	127,005	8.59	5	▲2
Rashtriya Janata Dal	98,694	6.67	3	New
Communist Party of India	85,643	5.79	4	▼1
Manipur State Congress Party	27,505	1.86	0	▼6
Lok Jan Shakti Party	22,233	1.50	0	▼2
Samajwadi Party	13,373	0.90	0	New
Bharatiya Janata Party	12,536	0.85	0	▼4
Janata Dal (Secular)	7,144	0.48	0	New
Janata Dal (United)	4,333	0.29	0	0
People's Democratic Alliance	1,508	0.10	0	New
Communist Party of India (Marxist)	1,232	0.08	0	0
Samata Party	861	0.06	–	▼3
Revolutionary Socialist Party	808	0.05	0	New
All India Forward Bloc	109	0.01	0	New
Independents	288,661	19.52	10	▲10
Total	1,479,025	100.00	60	0
Valid votes	1,479,025	99.97		
Invalid/blank votes	373	0.03		
Total votes	1,479,398	100.00		
Registered voters/turnout	1,707,204	86.66		
Source: ECI

=== Results by constituency ===
Winner, runner-up, voter turnout, and victory margin in every constituency
Assembly Constituency		Turnout	Winner				Runner Up				Margin
#k	Names	%	Candidate	Party	Votes	%	Candidate	Party	Votes	%	Margin
1	Khundrakpam	82.28%	Thokchom Navakumar Singh	NCP	3,305	17.31%	Laishram Premchandra Singh	CPI	2,723	14.26%	582
2	Heingang	86.74%	N. Biren Singh	INC	10,697	45.66%	Mutum Babita Devi	MPP	6,674	28.49%	4,023
3	Khurai	91.68%	Dr. N. G. Bijoy Singh	MPP	13,326	50.39%	Ngairangbam Bijoy Singh	INC	8,118	30.70%	5,208
4	Kshetrigao	91.66%	Thangjam Nandakishor Singh	NCP	7,470	29.29%	Mohd. Amin Shah	INC	7,116	27.90%	354
5	Thongju	89.46%	Bijoy Koijam	INC	11,941	50.36%	Thokchom Ajit Singh	Independent	7,167	30.23%	4,774
6	Keirao	89.79%	Md. Alauddin Khan	INC	7,648	35.64%	Karam Thamarjit Singh	MSCP	7,646	35.63%	2
7	Andro	90.72%	Thounaojam Shyamkumar Singh	MPP	18,388	74.73%	Salam Chandra Singh	INC	5,157	20.96%	13,231
8	Lamlai	92.72%	Pheiroijam Parijat Singh	CPI	7,696	33.96%	Kshetrimayum Biren Singh	INC	7,670	33.85%	26
9	Thangmeiband	77.34%	Radhabinod Koijam	NCP	7,073	35.13%	Jotin Waikhom	INC	5,945	29.53%	1,128
10	Uripok	81.42%	Laishram Nandakumar Singh	INC	7,066	41.44%	P. Achou Singh	MPP	6,120	35.89%	946
11	Sagolband	78.87%	Dr. Khwairakpam Loken Singh	INC	8,792	51.23%	Soram Natum Singh	RJD	7,306	42.57%	1,486
12	Keishamthong	85.34%	Langpoklakpam Jayantakumar Singh	INC	11,266	50.62%	Laisom Ibomcha Singh	MPP	10,431	46.87%	835
13	Singjamei	83.11%	Irengbam Hemochandra Singh	INC	7,791	47.38%	Sapam Tiken Singh	MPP	5,324	32.38%	2,467
14	Yaiskul	81.95%	Elangbam Kunjeswar Singh	INC	11,567	59.88%	Rajkumar Dorendra Singh	MPP	7,321	37.90%	4,246
15	Wangkhei	81.58%	Yumkham Erabot Singh	INC	7,917	31.49%	Anoubam Rajen	MPP	6,681	26.57%	1,236
16	Sekmai	82.91%	Dr. Heikham Borajao Singh	CPI	7,072	35.58%	Ningthoujam Biren	INC	6,284	31.62%	788
17	Lamsang	91.36%	Wangkheimayum Brajabidhu Singh	INC	13,468	53.67%	Sorokhaibam Rajen Singh	MPP	11,624	46.33%	1,844
18	Konthoujam	91.40%	Dr. Sapam Budhichandra Singh	INC	5,475	23.88%	Konthoujam Sharat Singh	MPP	5,391	23.51%	84
19	Patsoi	89.58%	Sapam Kunjakeswor Singh	Independent	8,936	34.18%	Dr. Leishangthem Chandramani Singh	MPP	7,292	27.89%	1,644
20	Langthabal	90.83%	O. Joy Singh	MPP	5,805	27.83%	Rebika Naorem	NCP	4,226	20.26%	1,579
21	Naoriya Pakhanglakpa	91.37%	R. K. Anand	MPP	10,598	39.41%	Keisham Rojenkumar Singh	RJD	7,861	29.23%	2,737
22	Wangoi	95.54%	Salam Joy Singh	NCP	7,171	32.82%	Wahengbam Nipamacha Singh	RJD	5,033	23.04%	2,138
23	Mayang Imphal	93.03%	Dr. Khumujam Ratankumar Singh	INC	8,265	37.99%	Maulana Abdus Salam	NCP	7,272	33.43%	993
24	Nambol	91.14%	Nameirakpam Loken Singh	INC	13,147	52.03%	Thounaojam Chaoba Singh	MPP	11,528	45.63%	1,619
25	Oinam	91.21%	Irengbam Ibohalbi Singh	MPP	7,443	32.59%	L. Radhakishore Singh	INC	6,677	29.23%	766
26	Bishnupur	87.59%	Govindas Konthoujam	INC	12,077	50.29%	Ningthoujam Sanajaoba Singh	MPP	7,919	32.98%	4,158
27	Moirang	83.68%	M. Manindra	INC	9,340	34.53%	Salam Gopal Singh	MPP	8,364	30.92%	976
28	Thanga	90.19%	Tongbram Mangibabu Singh	INC	6,412	35.51%	Haobijam Manisana Singh	MPP	5,252	29.08%	1,160
29	Kumbi	88.21%	Ningthoujam Mangi	CPI	7,368	33.38%	Sanasam Bira	INC	5,639	25.55%	1,729
30	Lilong	92.65%	Md. Helaluddin Khan	RJD	9,848	41.31%	Dr. Md. Maniruddin Shaikh	INC	8,283	34.75%	1,565
31	Thoubal	91.54%	Okram Ibobi Singh	INC	17,393	72.86%	Leitanthem Tomba Singh	MPP	6,316	26.46%	11,077
32	Wangkhem	90.25%	Keisham Meghachandra Singh	INC	10,801	46.81%	Dr. Nimai Chand Luwang	MPP	7,762	33.64%	3,039
33	Heirok	91.63%	Moirangthem Okendro	INC	13,775	57.71%	N. Sovakiran Singh	MPP	9,947	41.68%	3,828
34	Wangjing Tentha	90.76%	Moirangthem Hemanta Singh	INC	11,007	44.86%	Moirangthem Nara Singh	CPI	10,375	42.28%	632
35	Khangabok	91.38%	Okram Ibobi Singh	INC	16,782	62.98%	Laishram Jatra Singh	MPP	9,684	36.34%	7,098
36	Wabgai	88.32%	Dr. Usham Deben Singh	CPI	6,780	30.96%	Mayengbam Manihar Singh	MSCP	6,702	30.60%	78
37	Kakching	87.62%	Yengkhom Surchandra Singh	INC	10,881	51.28%	Thokchom Tomba Singh	CPI	8,894	41.92%	1,987
38	Hiyanglam	89.90%	Elangbam Dwijamani Singh	INC	7,141	32.58%	Maibam Kunjo Singh	NCP	6,756	30.82%	385
39	Sugnu	85.06%	Kangujam Ranjit Singh	INC	11,420	54.21%	Mayanglambam Binod	MPP	6,186	29.36%	5,234
40	Jiribam	75.48%	Thoudam Debendra Singh	INC	6,488	33.47%	A. Biren Singh	NCP	5,434	28.03%	1,054
41	Chandel	92.25%	Thangkholun Haokip	RJD	17,424	44.17%	L. Benjamin	Independent	7,563	19.17%	9,861
42	Tengnoupal	93.66%	Wairok Morung Makunga	Independent	21,408	48.27%	Chungsei	RJD	19,321	43.57%	2,087
43	Phungyar	82.26%	K. Wungnaoshang	Independent	10,700	48.86%	Victor Keishing	INC	10,577	48.30%	123
44	Ukhrul	73.17%	Danny Shaiza	Independent	10,267	39.42%	A. S. Arthur	INC	8,399	32.25%	1,868
45	Chingai	77.53%	Dr. Khashim Ruivah	Independent	17,796	60.88%	A. Aza	INC	9,731	33.29%	8,065
46	Saikul	85.02%	Doukhomang Khongsai	NCP	11,664	38.80%	Chungkhokai Doungel	INC	11,206	37.28%	458
47	Karong	96.07%	D. D. Thaisii	INC	14,655	31.58%	L. Jonathan	Independent	13,328	28.72%	1,327
48	Mao	80.01%	M. Thohrii	Independent	16,521	41.81%	Woba Joram	Independent	11,000	27.84%	5,521
49	Tadubi	94.52%	K. Raina	Independent	14,126	35.98%	N. Kayisii	Independent	13,512	34.42%	614
50	Kangpokpi	75.87%	Thangminlen Kipgen	MPP	8,693	38.50%	Kishore Thapa	Independent	6,522	28.88%	2,171
51	Saitu	84.27%	Haokholet Kipgen	Independent	17,637	53.79%	Ngamthang Haokip	INC	14,150	43.16%	3,487
52	Tamei	86.72%	Awangbow Newmai	Independent	7,042	27.87%	Z. Mangaibou	INC	6,646	26.31%	396
53	Tamenglong	81.19%	Khangthuanang Panmei	Independent	8,498	41.36%	Samuel Jendai	Independent	6,217	30.26%	2,281
54	Nungba	86.22%	Gaikhangam Gangmei	INC	11,595	63.85%	Gangmumei Kamei	Independent	6,012	33.10%	5,583
55	Tipaimukh	72.39%	Ngursanglur	RJD	4,946	39.61%	Dr. Chaltonlien Amo	INC	4,622	37.01%	324
56	Thanlon	80.71%	V. Hangkhanlian	MPP	7,695	49.36%	Zabiaksang	BJP	1,709	10.96%	5,986
57	Henglep	80.77%	T. Manga Vaiphei	INC	5,653	25.91%	T. Thangzalam Haokip	LJP	4,198	19.24%	1,455
58	Churachandpur	78.59%	Phungzathang Tonsing	INC	18,233	51.17%	V. Langkhanpau Guite	MPP	16,554	46.46%	1,679
59	Saikot	86.46%	T. N. Haokip	INC	13,010	36.22%	Lalthalien	NCP	9,347	26.02%	3,663
60	Singhat	90.76%	T. Hangkhanpau	MPP	12,859	56.90%	Thangso Baite	INC	9,673	42.80%	3,186

== See also ==
- List of constituencies of the Manipur Legislative Assembly
- 2007 elections in India
