= Political parties in Manipur =

List of Political Parties in Manipur, India

Different political parties in Manipur state of India are:

== Major national parties ==
- Bharatiya Janata Party (BJP)
- Indian National Congress (INC)
- National People's Party (NPP)
- Communist Party of India (CPI)

== Minor national-level parties ==
- Communist Party of India (Marxist) (CPM)

== Regional parties ==
- Revolutionary Socialist Party (RSP)
- All India Forward Bloc (AIFB)
- Republican Party of India (A) (RPIA)
- Manipur Peoples Party (MPP)
  - People's Democratic Alliance (PDA)
  - Meeyamgi Thougalloi Manipur (MTM) of Chungkham Joyraj
  - Manipur National Democratic Front (MNDF) of Ch. Priyokumar, Bijoy Koijam and K. Khagendra Singh
  - Manipur Democratic People's Front (MDPF) of Dr Gurumayum Tonsana Sharma
  - Manipur Peoples Conference (MPC) of B. Govind Sharma
- Peoples’ Resurgence and Justice Alliance (PRAJA)
- North East India Development Party (NEIDP)
- Naga People's Front (NPF)
- Naga National Party (NNP)
- Kuki National Assembly (KNA)
- Nationalist Congress Party (NCP)
- All India Trinamool Congress (AITC)
- Lok Janshakti Party (LJP)
- Janata Dal (United) (JDU)
- Samata Party (SAP)
- Janata Dal (Secular) (JDS)
- Rashtriya Janata Dal (RJD)
- Samajwadi Party (SP)

Note: There is a proposal to merge People's Democratic Alliance, Meeyamgi Thougalloi Manipur, Manipur National Democratic Front, Manipur Democratic People's Front, and Manipur Peoples Conference with Manipur Peoples Party.

== Defunct regional parties ==
- Manipur United Front (MUF)
- Manipur Hill People's Council(MHPC)
- Manipur Hills Union (MHU)
- United Naga Integration Council (UNIC) {merged with Congress}
- Democratic People's Party (DPP)
- Manipur Nationalist Congress {merged with Congress}
- Janata Dal (Loken) {merged with Congress}
- Progressive Federal Party of Manipur {merged with BJP}
- Manipur Regional Congress Party (MRCP) of Radhabinod Koijam {merged with Samata Party}
- Democratic Revolutionary Peoples Party (DRPP) of N. Biren Singh {merged with Congress}
- Manipur National Conference (MNC) of Wahengbam Nipamacha Singh {merged with RJD}
- Manipur State Congress Party (Progressive) (MSCP-P) of Wahengbam Nipamacha Singh {merged with BJP}
- Manipur State Congress Party (Chaoba) (MSCP-C) of Thounaojam Chaoba Singh {merged with BJP}
- Manipur State Congress Party (Mani) (MSCP-M) of Yumnam Mani Singh {merged with Congress}
- Federal Party of Manipur (FPM) of Gangmumei Kamei {merged with Manipur Peoples Party}
