= 1990 Manipur Legislative Assembly election =

Legislative Assembly election in Manipur, India

- 12 February 1990

54 seats in the Manipur Legislative Assembly 28 seats needed for a majority
- Registered: 1,112,853
- Turnout: 89.95%
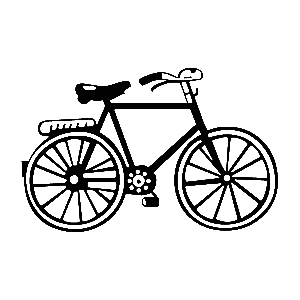

	Majority party	Minority party
Leader	Raj Kumar Ranbir Singh
Party	MPP	INC
Leader's seat	Keishamthong
Seats before	3	30
Seats won	9	24
Seat change	▲6	▼6
Popular vote	19.40%	33.71%
CM before election
Raj Kumar Jaichandra Singh
INC
Elected CM
Raj Kumar Ranbir Singh
MPP

Elections to the Manipur Legislative Assembly were held in February 1990, to elect members of the 60 constituencies in Manipur, India. The Indian National Congress won the most seats as well as the popular vote, but Raj Kumar Ranbir Singh of the Manipur Peoples Party was appointed as the Chief Minister of Manipur.

After the passing of the North-Eastern Areas (Reorganisation) Act, 1971, Manipur was converted from a Union Territory to a State and the size of its Legislative Assembly was increased from 30 to 60 members.

== Result ==
Party	Votes	%	Seats	+/–
Indian National Congress	333,765	33.71	24	▼6
Janata Dal	196,207	19.82	11	New
Manipur Peoples Party	199,837	20.19	10	▲7
Indian Congress (Socialist) – Sarat Chandra Sinha	122,829	12.41	4	New
Communist Party of India	41,012	4.14	3	▲2
Kuki National Assembly	25,867	2.61	2	▲1
Bharatiya Janata Party	18,549	1.87	0	0
Manipur Hill People's Council	8,820	0.89	0	New
Independents	43,101	4.35	0	▼21
Total	989,987	100.00	54	▼6
Valid votes	989,987	98.90		
Invalid/blank votes	10,997	1.10		
Total votes	1,000,984	100.00		
Registered voters/turnout	1,112,853	89.95		
Source: ECI

=== Results by constituency ===
Winner, runner-up, voter turnout, and victory margin in every constituency
Assembly Constituency		Turnout	Winner				Runner Up				Margin
#k	Names	%	Candidate	Party	Votes	%	Candidate	Party	Votes	%	Margin
1	Khurai	87.83%	Chandam Manihar	MPP	6,111	34.42%	Atomba Ngairangbamcha	INS(SCS)	5,344	30.10%	767
2	Keirao	94.54%	Hidam Bidur Singh	JD	7,034	38.23%	Konthoujam Rajmani Singh	INS(SCS)	4,289	23.31%	2,745
3	Andro	93.39%	L. Amujou	INC	7,776	38.57%	Salam Chandra Singh	MPP	6,724	33.35%	1,052
4	Lamlai	85.76%	Pheiroijam Parijat Singh	CPI	4,817	29.51%	Kshetrimayum Biren Singh	MPP	4,669	28.60%	148
5	Thangmeiband	81.56%	Ngangbam Kumarjit	MPP	9,885	59.12%	Koijam Radhabinod Singh	INC	6,476	38.73%	3,409
6	Uripok	82.95%	T. Gunadhwaja Singh	INC	4,159	34.44%	Achou Singh Paonam	INS(SCS)	3,324	27.52%	835
7	Sagolband	80.92%	R. K. Jaichandra	INC	7,443	49.70%	Moirangthem Kumar Singh	MPP	5,795	38.69%	1,648
8	Keishamthong	86.11%	Rajkumar Ranbir Singh	MPP	6,987	40.51%	Laisom Lalit Singh	INC	6,061	35.14%	926
9	Singjamei	87.76%	Irengbam Tompok Singh	INC	6,915	49.88%	Haobam Bhuban Singh	MPP	6,689	48.25%	226
10	Yaiskul	88.70%	Rajkumar Dorendra Singh	INC	6,708	42.34%	Elangbam Kunjeswar Singh	JD	5,047	31.85%	1,661
11	Wangkhei	77.08%	Haobam Borobabu	MPP	11,487	55.74%	Yumkham Erabot Singh	INC	8,758	42.50%	2,729
12	Sekmai	89.71%	Ningthoujam Biren	INC	4,188	29.22%	Khwirakpam Chaoba	MPP	3,823	26.67%	365
13	Lamsang	91.45%	Deven	MPP	5,454	31.85%	Ph. Sagar Singh	JD	4,995	29.17%	459
14	Konthoujam	97.70%	Heigrujam Thoithoi	MPP	8,817	49.46%	Henam Lokhon Singh	INC	6,734	37.78%	2,083
15	Patsoi	89.10%	N. Ibomcha	INS(SCS)	9,103	49.54%	Dr. Leishangthem Chandramani Singh	INC	6,854	37.30%	2,249
16	Wangoi	93.76%	Nipamacha Singh	INS(SCS)	4,645	30.79%	Chungkham Rajmohan Singh	INC	3,895	25.82%	750
17	Mayang Imphal	87.78%	Khumujam Amutombi Singh	JD	7,907	40.58%	Meinam Nilchandra Singh	INC	6,301	32.34%	1,606
18	Nambol	93.42%	Thounaojam Chaoba Singh	INC	8,759	48.42%	Hidangmayum Shyakishor Sharma	INS(SCS)	4,939	27.30%	3,820
19	Oinam	93.28%	Keisham Bira Singh	INC	6,047	37.45%	Yamnam Yaima Singh	MPP	4,944	30.62%	1,103
20	Bishnupur	91.29%	Khundrakpamjibon Singh	JD	4,654	27.18%	Khundrakpampulinkant Singh	BJP	3,876	22.64%	778
21	Moirang	85.61%	Mairembam Koireng Singh	INC	3,779	18.53%	Hemam Bir Singh	Independent	3,574	17.52%	205
22	Thanga	91.62%	Salam Ibohal Singh	MPP	3,210	23.80%	Heisnam Sanayaima Singh	INC	2,845	21.09%	365
23	Kumbi	85.98%	Ningthoujam Mangi	CPI	3,758	24.92%	Sanasam Bira	INC	3,451	22.89%	307
24	Lilong	94.86%	Md. Helaluddin Khan	INC	8,814	53.87%	Alauddin	MPP	7,178	43.87%	1,636
25	Thongju	92.34%	Thoudam Krishna Singh	JD	9,956	50.67%	Leitanthem Toma	INC	9,361	47.65%	595
26	Wangkhem	95.94%	Nimaichand Luwang	INC	11,022	59.19%	Nongthombam Shamu Singh	MPP	6,875	36.92%	4,147
27	Heirok	90.90%	Nongmeikapam Komol Singh	JD	8,207	43.83%	Moirangthem Tombi	INC	7,566	40.41%	641
28	Wangjing Tentha	90.18%	Moirangthem Nara Singh	CPI	6,078	31.07%	Moirangthem Hemanta	INC	5,409	27.65%	669
29	Khangabok	95.19%	Okram Ibobi Singh	INC	7,320	34.65%	Moirangthem Borajao Singh	MPP	4,998	23.66%	2,322
30	Wabgai	95.93%	Mayengbam Manihar Singh	INC	4,757	27.27%	Abdul Salam	MPP	4,553	26.11%	204
31	Kakching	85.58%	N. Nimai Singh	INC	7,963	48.69%	Ksh. Irabot	CPI	6,264	38.30%	1,699
32	Hiyanglam	89.99%	Elangbam Biramani Singh	INC	5,047	34.03%	Maibam Kunjo Singh	JD	4,904	33.07%	143
33	Sugnu	88.80%	Loitongbam Ibomcha Singh	JD	7,708	42.77%	Mayanglambam Babu Singh	INC	5,468	30.34%	2,240
34	Jiribam	79.50%	Th. Debendra	INC	8,069	48.30%	Habib Ali	JD	3,760	22.51%	4,309
35	Chandel	94.82%	B. D. Behring	JD	6,653	25.23%	H. T. Thungam	INC	6,633	25.16%	20
36	Tengnoupal	90.83%	Wairok Morung Makunga	INC	11,626	54.09%	Paokholun Haokip	INS(SCS)	2,981	13.87%	8,645
37	Phungyar	83.07%	Rishang Keishing	INC	6,798	38.34%	N. Solomon	INS(SCS)	4,462	25.16%	2,336
38	Ukhrul	85.68%	Hangmi Shaiza	JD	7,922	43.97%	A. S. Arthur	INC	6,828	37.90%	1,094
39	Chingai	83.19%	Somi A. Shimray	MPP	6,180	26.52%	Mashangthei Horam	INC	6,174	26.50%	6
40	Saikul	91.04%	Chungkhokai Doungel	INS(SCS)	8,508	38.60%	Holkholet Khongsai	INC	5,023	22.79%	3,485
41	Karong	97.08%	K. S. Benjamin Banee	INC	12,272	40.11%	L. Jonathan	JD	10,312	33.70%	1,960
42	Mao	98.25%	Lorho	INC	10,425	32.69%	M. Thohrii	INS(SCS)	9,576	30.03%	849
43	Tadubi	91.20%	N. G. Luikang	INC	11,244	39.61%	S. Hangzing	INS(SCS)	10,675	37.61%	569
44	Kangpokpi	92.18%	L. S. John	JD	4,529	24.09%	Shehkhogin Pagin Kipgen	INS(SCS)	4,502	23.94%	27
45	Saitu	94.82%	Ngamthang Haokip	MPP	8,468	40.12%	S. L. Paokhosei	INC	6,829	32.35%	1,639
46	Tamei	95.12%	I. D. Dijuanang	INC	7,725	35.33%	N. Pauheu	Independent	4,807	21.99%	2,918
47	Tamenglong	88.16%	Daisin Pamei	JD	5,024	32.62%	G. Phenrong	INC	3,797	24.65%	1,227
48	Nungba	94.53%	Gaikhangam Gangmei	INC	8,235	51.43%	Gangmumei Kamei	JD	7,592	47.41%	643
49	Tipaimukh	86.61%	Selkai Hrangchal	JD	8,506	74.01%	Ngurdinglien Sanate	INC	2,793	24.30%	5,713
50	Thanlon	83.66%	T. Phungzathang	INC	6,522	47.16%	Songchinkhup	JD	5,231	37.82%	1,291
51	Henglep	93.37%	Holkhomang	INS(SCS)	5,813	29.12%	Sehpu Haokip	INC	4,884	24.46%	929
52	Churachandpur	88.08%	V. Hangkhanlian	MPP	3,705	18.52%	S. Ngulsing	JD	2,858	14.29%	847
53	Saikot	91.66%	T. N. Haokip	KNA	7,267	33.72%	Vanlainghak F. Tusing	JD	5,770	26.78%	1,497
54	Singhat	90.26%	Thangkhanlal	KNA	6,464	37.54%	T. Gouzadou	INC	4,441	25.79%	2,023

== See also ==
- List of constituencies of the Manipur Legislative Assembly
- 1990 elections in India
