= 1980 Manipur Legislative Assembly election =

Legislative Assembly election in Manipur, India

- 3 and 6 January 1980

All 60 seats in the Manipur Legislative Assembly 31 seats needed for a majority
- Registered: 909,268
- Turnout: 82.42%
	Majority party	Minority party
		JP
Leader	Raj Kumar Dorendra Singh
Party	INC	JP
Leader's seat	Yaiskul
Seats before	13	New
Seats won	13	10
Seat change	–
Popular vote	21.63%	19.71%
CM before election
President's Rule
Elected CM
Raj Kumar Dorendra Singh
INC

Elections to the Manipur Legislative Assembly were held in January 1980 to elect members of the 60 constituencies in Manipur, India. The Indian National Congress won the most seats as well as the popular vote, and Raj Kumar Dorendra Singh was reappointed as the Chief Minister of Manipur.

After the passing of the North-Eastern Areas (Reorganisation) Act, 1971, Manipur was converted from a Union Territory to a State and the size of its Legislative Assembly was increased from 30 to 60 members.

== Result ==
Party	Votes	%	Seats	+/–
Indian National Congress (I)	158,127	21.63	13	New
Janata Party	144,112	19.71	10	New
Indian National Congress (U)	69,319	9.48	6	New
Communist Party of India	53,055	7.26	5	▼1
Manipur Peoples Party	48,196	6.59	4	▼16
Janata Party (Secular)	20,667	2.83	0	New
Kuki National Assembly	20,600	2.82	2	0
Communist Party of India (Marxist)	4,168	0.57	1	▲1
Janata Party (JP)	924	0.13	0	New
Independents	211,855	28.98	19	▲14
Total	731,023	100.00	60	0
Valid votes	731,023	97.55		
Invalid/blank votes	18,381	2.45		
Total votes	749,404	100.00		
Registered voters/turnout	909,268	82.42		
Source: ECI

=== Results by constituency ===
Winner, runner-up, voter turnout, and victory margin in every constituency
Assembly Constituency		Turnout	Winner				Runner Up				Margin
#k	Names	%	Candidate	Party	Votes	%	Candidate	Party	Votes	%	Margin
1	Khundrakpam	71.03%	Yumlembam Kulla	CPI(M)	2,241	20.08%	Langonjan Tikendra	Independent	1,645	14.74%	596
2	Heingang	85.56%	Waikhom Jagor Singh	Independent	3,388	28.43%	Longjan Ningthemjao	INC(I)	2,387	20.03%	1,001
3	Khurai	80.60%	Chandam Manihar	MPP	2,577	22.06%	Atomba Ngairangbamcha	INC(I)	2,392	20.48%	185
4	Kshetrigao	84.54%	Muhammaddin	INC(U)	2,361	19.02%	Moirangthem Ibohal	CPI	2,045	16.47%	316
5	Thongju	85.03%	Oinam Tomba	Independent	3,241	26.04%	Waikhom Tolen	MPP	2,302	18.50%	939
6	Keirao	83.95%	Abdul Matalip	Independent	2,985	25.10%	Takhellambam Tomba	CPI	2,705	22.74%	280
7	Andro	83.15%	Loitongbam Amujou	INC(U)	6,905	49.38%	Ashraf Ali	JP	5,704	40.80%	1,201
8	Lamlai	76.41%	Pheiroijam Parijat Singh	CPI	4,197	40.20%	Yumkhibam Kerani	INC(I)	3,114	29.83%	1,083
9	Thangmeiband	66.79%	Radhabinod Koijam	Independent	2,274	21.91%	Gangummei	Independent	1,829	17.62%	445
10	Uripok	72.24%	Paonam Achaou Singh	Independent	2,140	26.05%	L. Rachumani Singh	JP	1,242	15.12%	898
11	Sagolband	75.03%	Moirangthem Kumar Singh	MPP	1,862	18.44%	Salam Damodar Singh	Independent	1,134	11.23%	728
12	Keishamthong	80.12%	Lasihram Manobi	MPP	1,998	15.02%	P. Shyamkishore	INC(U)	1,649	12.40%	349
13	Singjamei	79.75%	I. Tompok Singh	INC(U)	2,309	23.05%	Th Chandrasekhar	JP	1,766	17.63%	543
14	Yaiskul	76.63%	Rajkumar Dorendra Singh	INC(I)	4,609	41.84%	Ayekpam Biramangol Singh	JP	2,744	24.91%	1,865
15	Wangkhei	74.50%	Yumkham Irabot Singh	JP	4,052	31.23%	Ahamadullah Mirza	INC(I)	2,914	22.46%	1,138
16	Sekmai	82.49%	Khwirakpam Chaoba	JP	3,568	33.66%	Khangembam Leirijao	INC(I)	2,580	24.34%	988
17	Lamsang	83.45%	Phuritsabam Sagar Singh	Independent	2,329	18.74%	Khundongbam Jugeshwar	CPI	2,260	18.19%	69
18	Konthoujam	87.69%	Henam Lokhon Singh	INC(I)	2,711	21.24%	Thangjam Babu	CPI	2,581	20.22%	130
19	Patsoi	80.94%	Dr. Leishangthem Chandramani Singh	JP	3,225	25.95%	Nongmaithem Ibomcha	MPP	2,718	21.87%	507
20	Langthabal	84.65%	O. Joy Singh	JP	4,063	35.55%	Karam Babudhon Singh	INC(U)	3,479	30.44%	584
21	Naoriya Pakhanglakpa	86.18%	Wahengbam Angou Singh	INC(U)	5,320	37.66%	Akoijam Ibobi	MPP	4,180	29.59%	1,140
22	Wangoi	89.25%	Chungkham Rajmohan Singh	INC(I)	4,749	41.16%	Wahengbam Nipamacha Singh	JP	4,063	35.21%	686
23	Mayang Imphal	83.42%	Khunujam Amutombi	INC(I)	4,569	35.39%	Abdul Latip	JP	2,795	21.65%	1,774
24	Nambol	91.34%	Thounaojam Chaoba Singh	JP	4,678	33.22%	Hidangmayum Shyakishor Sharma	INC(I)	4,506	32.00%	172
25	Oinam	89.53%	Yamnam Yaima Singh	JP	4,220	33.41%	Keisham Bira Singh	INC(I)	3,998	31.65%	222
26	Bishnupur	87.05%	Khundrakpampulinkant Singh	INC(U)	2,531	20.01%	Konthoujamgojendro Singh	Independent	2,257	17.84%	274
27	Moirang	82.13%	Mairembam Koireng Singh	JP	5,052	33.11%	Heman Nilamani Singh	JP(S)	4,582	30.03%	470
28	Thanga	90.37%	Haojam Kangjamba Singh	Independent	3,711	35.90%	Kaisanam Yaima	JP(S)	2,958	28.61%	753
29	Kumbi	80.27%	Khangembam Manimohan	INC(I)	2,650	22.73%	Sanasam Bira	INC(U)	2,643	22.67%	7
30	Lilong	87.96%	Md. Helaluddin Khan	INC(I)	7,629	59.41%	Mohammed Alimuddin	JP	4,680	36.45%	2,949
31	Thoubal	89.58%	Thodam Krishna	MPP	3,701	26.39%	Akoijam Ibomcha	INC(U)	3,633	25.90%	68
32	Wangkhem	88.21%	Pangambam Munal Singh	Independent	2,991	22.38%	Iboton	Independent	2,201	16.47%	790
33	Heirok	87.62%	Moirangthem Tombi	JP	4,936	38.25%	Nongmeikapam Nilakamal	INC(I)	4,754	36.84%	182
34	Wangjing Tentha	86.92%	Laishram Saratchandra Singh	Independent	3,221	25.02%	Moirangthem Nara Singh	CPI	2,432	18.89%	789
35	Khangabok	83.01%	Thokchom Achouba	CPI	3,139	24.35%	Md. Abdul Jabar	Independent	2,812	21.81%	327
36	Wabgai	84.27%	Abdul Salam	Independent	2,634	21.02%	Naorem Mohandas	Independent	1,894	15.12%	740
37	Kakching	85.90%	Kshetri Irabot	CPI	4,365	37.37%	Yengkhom Thambal	JP	3,916	33.53%	449
38	Hiyanglam	85.99%	Elangbam Babudhon	CPI	3,487	27.77%	Elangbam Biramani Singh	INC(U)	3,027	24.10%	460
39	Sugnu	86.56%	Mayanglambam Nila Singh	CPI	3,836	30.37%	Mayanglambam Babu Singh	INC(U)	2,923	23.14%	913
40	Jiribam	75.59%	Devendra Singh	Independent	6,731	63.08%	S. Bijoy	JP	3,003	28.14%	3,728
41	Chandel	86.88%	Satkholal	KNA	6,075	33.24%	Lh. Angno	INC(I)	3,251	17.79%	2,824
42	Tengnoupal	81.95%	Jainson Haokip	KNA	5,055	34.29%	K. Leithil	INC(I)	3,512	23.82%	1,543
43	Phungyar	76.60%	Rishang Keishing	INC(I)	5,440	45.76%	M. C. Ngathingkhui	JP	3,045	25.61%	2,395
44	Ukhrul	77.44%	Yangmaso Shaiza	JP	6,191	47.89%	S. Zingthan	INC(I)	5,040	38.99%	1,151
45	Chingai	78.02%	Somi A. Shimray	JP	5,472	39.95%	P. Peter	Independent	5,060	36.95%	412
46	Saikul	76.45%	Holkholet Khongsai	INC(U)	2,456	18.37%	K. S. Seiboy	KNA	2,136	15.98%	320
47	Karong	82.99%	Vio	Independent	6,057	35.71%	K. S. Benjamin Banee	JP	4,407	25.98%	1,650
48	Mao	89.97%	Soso Lorho	INC(I)	6,897	35.53%	Kh. Thekho	JP	5,576	28.72%	1,321
49	Tadubi	84.14%	Luikang	Independent	5,218	32.18%	Haokholet	MPP	3,907	24.10%	1,311
50	Kangpokpi	89.56%	Kishore Thapa	INC(I)	5,353	46.56%	Taokhosli Kipgen	Independent	3,233	28.12%	2,120
51	Saitu	84.83%	L. S. John	Independent	2,615	17.98%	Althing	JP	2,496	17.16%	119
52	Tamei	78.00%	I. D. Dijuanang	INC(I)	5,211	43.35%	Ilunang	Independent	3,054	25.40%	2,157
53	Tamenglong	73.01%	K. Huriang	Independent	3,318	35.11%	Phenrong	JP	2,043	21.62%	1,275
54	Nungba	77.03%	Saikhangam	Independent	2,905	30.71%	Jangamlung	JP	2,168	22.92%	737
55	Tipaimukh	81.84%	Ngurdinglien Sanate	INC(I)	3,872	42.35%	Selkai Hrangchal	Independent	3,556	38.89%	316
56	Thanlon	79.69%	T. Phungzathang	INC(I)	5,264	48.94%	Thangkhangin	Independent	3,344	31.09%	1,920
57	Henglep	83.31%	Holkhomang	Independent	3,233	24.59%	Mangkhothong	INC(I)	3,091	23.51%	142
58	Churachandpur	79.25%	K. Vungzalian	Independent	4,431	39.60%	Baukholal Thangjem	INC(I)	3,231	28.87%	1,200
59	Saikot	83.51%	Ngulkhohau	Independent	3,719	27.62%	T. Kholly	Independent	2,814	20.90%	905
60	Singhat	81.18%	Thangkhanlal	INC(I)	3,701	32.19%	Henlianthang Thanglet	INC(U)	3,365	29.27%	336

== See also ==
- List of constituencies of the Manipur Legislative Assembly
- 1980 elections in India
