= 1974 Manipur Legislative Assembly election =

Legislative Assembly election in Manipur, India

- 19–25 February 1974

All 60 seats in the Manipur Legislative Assembly 31 seats needed for a majority
- Registered: 719,971
- Turnout: 84.60%
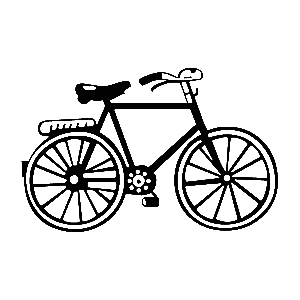

	Majority party	Minority party
Leader	Mohammed Alimuddin
Party	MPP	INC(R)
Leader's seat	Lilong
Seats before	15	17
Seats won	20	13
Seat change	▲5	▼4
Popular vote	22.55%	27.62%
CM before election
President's Rule
Elected CM
Mohammed Alimuddin
MPP

Elections to the Manipur Legislative Assembly were held in February 1974 to elect members of the 60 constituencies in Manipur, India. The Indian National Congress won the popular vote, but the Manipur Peoples Party won the most seats and its leader Mohammed Alimuddin was reappointed as the Chief Minister of Manipur.

After the passing of the North-Eastern Areas (Reorganisation) Act, 1971, Manipur was converted from a Union Territory to a State and the size of its Legislative Assembly was increased from 30 to 60 members.

== Result ==
Party	Votes	%	Seats	+/–
Indian National Congress	164,717	27.62	13	▼4
Manipur Peoples Party	134,493	22.55	20	▲5
Manipur Hills Union	55,879	9.37	12	New
Socialist Party	35,349	5.93	2	▼1
Communist Party of India	33,039	5.54	6	▲1
Kuki National Assembly	17,592	2.95	2	New
Indian National Congress (Organisation)	8,764	1.47	0	▼1
Communist Party of India (Marxist)	3,347	0.56	0	0
Independents	143,241	24.02	5	▼14
Total	596,421	100.00	60	0
Valid votes	596,421	97.91		
Invalid/blank votes	12,701	2.09		
Total votes	609,122	100.00		
Registered voters/turnout	719,971	84.60		
Source: ECI

=== Results by constituency ===
Winner, runner-up, voter turnout, and victory margin in every constituency
Assembly Constituency		Turnout	Winner				Runner Up				Margin
#k	Names	%	Candidate	Party	Votes	%	Candidate	Party	Votes	%	Margin
1	Khundrakpam	77.11%	Maibam Hera Lairellakpam	CPI	3,567	41.53%	Gourahari Singh	MPP	1,747	20.34%	1,820
2	Heingang	89.01%	Nongthombam Chaoba Singh	Independent	4,129	40.85%	Aribam Bimala Devi	MPP	2,859	28.28%	1,270
3	Khurai	86.07%	Kongbrailakpam Borthakur Sharma	Socialist Party (India, 1971)	3,362	32.84%	Atomba Ngairangbamcha	INC	2,685	26.23%	677
4	Kshetrigao	87.98%	Abdul Wahid	MPP	3,749	35.29%	Abdul Haque	Socialist Party (India, 1971)	3,362	31.65%	387
5	Thongju	89.29%	Hawaibam Shyama Singh	Socialist Party (India, 1971)	3,385	31.26%	Oinam Tomba Singh	INC	2,934	27.09%	451
6	Keirao	86.82%	Mohamad Jaluddin	MPP	4,344	46.92%	Ngangbam Bira	INC	2,645	28.57%	1,699
7	Andro	89.80%	Ashraf Ali	MPP	5,085	41.71%	Kshetrimayum Kirti Singh	INC	3,460	28.38%	1,625
8	Lamlai	82.18%	Pheiroijam Parijat Singh	CPI	2,797	29.65%	Yumkhaibam Kerani Singh	Independent	2,019	21.40%	778
9	Thangmeiband	72.62%	Maibam Gouramani	MPP	4,235	50.55%	Sagolsem Ibomcha	INC	3,483	41.57%	752
10	Uripok	75.70%	M. Meghachandra Singh	CPI	2,547	37.32%	Laisram Jugeswar Singh	MPP	2,341	34.31%	206
11	Sagolband	76.99%	Salam Tombi	MPP	3,359	37.44%	Thokchom Bira	CPI	2,566	28.60%	793
12	Keishamthong	81.93%	Rajkumar Ranbir Singh	INC	4,033	36.81%	Lasihram Manobi	MPP	3,974	36.28%	59
13	Singjamei	87.49%	Sanasam Biramani Singh	Independent	2,263	26.76%	Laisram Joychandra	MPP	2,191	25.91%	72
14	Yaiskul	84.69%	Rajkumar Dorendra Singh	MPP	3,319	36.15%	Hawaibam Nilamani Singh	INC	2,935	31.97%	384
15	Wangkhei	76.59%	Khaidem Pishak Singh	MPP	3,421	36.86%	Seram Angouba Singh	INC	2,577	27.76%	844
16	Sekmai	89.29%	Khwirakpam Chaoba	MPP	4,734	51.74%	Khangembam Leirijao	INC	4,146	45.32%	588
17	Lamsang	87.95%	Khundongbam Jugeswar	CPI	2,696	24.92%	Laisram Shamu Singh	MPP	2,695	24.91%	1
18	Konthoujam	89.04%	Heigrujam Thoithoi	Independent	2,878	26.58%	Khangembam Lakshman	MPP	2,293	21.17%	585
19	Patsoi	86.85%	Dr. Leishangthem Chandramani Singh	MPP	5,033	45.36%	Nongthombam Ibomcha Singh	Independent	2,473	22.29%	2,560
20	Langthabal	89.24%	O. Joy Singh	MPP	2,415	26.18%	Pukhhambam Orendro	Independent	2,212	23.98%	203
21	Naoriya Pakhanglakpa	84.91%	Tokpam Sanajao Singh	MPP	3,626	31.99%	Wahengbam Angou Singh	INC	3,082	27.19%	544
22	Wangoi	86.09%	W. Nipamacha Singh	INC	4,729	53.52%	Chungkham Rajmohan Singh	MPP	3,862	43.71%	867
23	Mayang Imphal	84.91%	Abdul Latip	MPP	3,512	35.01%	Khaidem Mangol Singh	CPI	3,018	30.09%	494
24	Nambol	91.91%	Thounaojam Chaoba Singh	MPP	5,396	48.92%	Hidangmayum Shyakishor Sharma	INC	5,355	48.55%	41
25	Oinam	92.25%	Yamnam Yaima Singh	MPP	5,103	49.83%	Muthum Amutombi Singh	INC	4,988	48.71%	115
26	Bishnupur	87.59%	Khaidem Rath Singh	INC	3,739	38.24%	Mairembam Nilachandra Singh	MPP	3,008	30.77%	731
27	Moirang	86.55%	Kiyam Shyam Singh	INC	6,268	49.54%	Heman Nilamani Singh	MPP	6,080	48.06%	188
28	Thanga	88.99%	Salam Jayantakumar Singh	INC	3,037	34.14%	Heisnam Yaima Singh	MPP	2,936	33.00%	101
29	Kumbi	81.69%	Wahengbam Komol	MPP	4,951	54.46%	Mairembam Koireng	INC	3,517	38.69%	1,434
30	Lilong	86.20%	Mohammed Alimuddin	MPP	5,989	57.44%	Abdul Quadir Shah	INC	4,111	39.43%	1,878
31	Thoubal	91.88%	Koijam Mangi Singh	MPP	3,366	29.28%	Thoudam Krishna Singh	Independent	3,157	27.46%	209
32	Wangkhem	92.36%	Chaoba	MPP	2,641	23.16%	Laishram Modhu Singh	INC	1,973	17.30%	668
33	Heirok	88.61%	Moirangthem Tombi	INC	6,171	55.96%	Soibam Kushmu Singh	MPP	4,563	41.38%	1,608
34	Wangjing Tentha	90.36%	Saqam Ibomcha Singh	Independent	2,362	21.53%	Naorem Kunjobabu	MPP	1,982	18.06%	380
35	Khangabok	88.09%	Thokchom Achouba	CPI	3,491	32.69%	Moirangthem Borajao Singh	MPP	2,820	26.41%	671
36	Wabgai	81.92%	Habibur Rahaman	INC	4,271	42.20%	Naorem Mohandas	MPP	2,996	29.60%	1,275
37	Kakching	92.56%	Kshetri Irubot	CPI	3,622	36.45%	Yengkhom Nimal	Socialist Party (India, 1971)	3,004	30.23%	618
38	Hiyanglam	88.79%	Maibam Kunjo	MPP	1,908	19.75%	Elangbam Babudhan	CPI	1,884	19.51%	24
39	Sugnu	84.56%	Khaidem Nimaichand	MPP	4,090	40.98%	Mayanglambam Nila Singh	CPI	3,430	34.37%	660
40	Jiribam	75.38%	S. Bijoy	INC	2,843	33.60%	Devendra Singh	Independent	2,611	30.86%	232
41	Chandel	90.01%	H. T. Thungam	Manipur Hills Union	3,490	24.16%	Nula Thumsing	INC	3,303	22.87%	187
42	Tengnoupal	80.99%	L. Rongman	Manipur Hills Union	3,207	30.02%	N. G. Hermashing	INC	2,558	23.94%	649
43	Phungyar	74.18%	Rishang Keishing	INC	4,861	56.89%	Stephen Angkang	Manipur Hills Union	3,585	41.96%	1,276
44	Ukhrul	77.90%	Yangmaso Shaiza	Manipur Hills Union	5,201	51.75%	K. Envey	INC	4,723	46.99%	478
45	Chingai	78.63%	Somi A. Shimray	Manipur Hills Union	4,847	44.29%	P. Peter	INC	3,834	35.03%	1,013
46	Saikul	85.45%	Shonkhothang Ashon	INC	3,580	27.72%	Lalkhohen	KNA	3,210	24.85%	370
47	Karong	81.47%	K. S. Benjamin Banee	Independent	4,681	39.38%	Vio	Manipur Hills Union	4,225	35.55%	456
48	Mao	94.65%	Kh. Thekho	Manipur Hills Union	3,764	26.48%	Lohrii	INC	3,612	25.41%	152
49	Tadubi	78.90%	Saheni Adani	Manipur Hills Union	3,464	29.97%	Khupkholam	KNA	3,208	27.75%	256
50	Kangpokpi	82.38%	Kishore Thapa	INC	5,029	52.83%	Paokhosei	KNA	4,117	43.25%	912
51	Saitu	80.21%	Zampu	KNA	2,458	20.48%	Paokhosei Kipgen	INC	2,446	20.38%	12
52	Tamei	74.33%	Pauheu	Manipur Hills Union	3,287	40.21%	Dijuanang	INC	2,254	27.57%	1,033
53	Tamenglong	77.26%	T. P. Kiuliangpou	Manipur Hills Union	3,152	42.36%	Huriang	Independent	1,602	21.53%	1,550
54	Nungba	77.41%	Jangamlung	Manipur Hills Union	1,618	23.23%	Pougailungpou	Independent	1,563	22.44%	55
55	Tipaimukh	84.48%	Ngurdinglien Sanate	INC	3,528	47.02%	Hmangkhum Joute	Independent	2,842	37.88%	686
56	Thanlon	77.93%	N. Gouzagin	Manipur Hills Union	4,337	51.74%	Tunzakham	INC	3,824	45.62%	513
57	Henglep	85.23%	Holkhomang	INC	7,335	55.64%	N. Hauneikhup	Independent	5,481	41.57%	1,854
58	Churachandpur	77.57%	Haukholal Thangjom	Manipur Hills Union	4,242	47.22%	T. Kaigou	INC	2,313	25.75%	1,929
59	Saikot	95.74%	Ngulkhohao	KNA	3,245	27.47%	T. Kholly	Independent	2,590	21.92%	655
60	Singhat	82.51%	Gougin	Manipur Hills Union	5,276	55.91%	Thangkhanlal	INC	3,872	41.03%	1,404

== See also ==
- List of constituencies of the Manipur Legislative Assembly
- 1974 elections in India
