= 1984 Manipur Legislative Assembly election =

Legislative Assembly election in Manipur, India

- 27 December 1984 and 3 May 1985

All 60 seats in the Manipur Legislative Assembly 31 seats needed for a majority
- Registered: 1,013,680
- Turnout: 87.29%
	Majority party	Minority party
		JP
Leader	Raj Kumar Jaichandra Singh
Party	INC	JP
Leader's seat	Yaiskul
Seats before	0	10
Seats won	30	4
Seat change	▲17	▼6
Popular vote	29.82%	6.08%
CM before election
Rishang Keishing
INC
Elected CM
Rishang Keishing
INC

Elections to the Manipur Legislative Assembly were held from December 1984 to May 1985, to elect members of the 60 constituencies in Manipur, India. The Indian National Congress won the most seats as well as the popular vote, and Rishang Keishing was reappointed as the Chief Minister of Manipur.

After the passing of the North-Eastern Areas (Reorganisation) Act, 1971, Manipur was converted from a Union Territory to a State and the size of its Legislative Assembly was increased from 30 to 60 members.

== Result ==
Party	Votes	%	Seats	+/–
Indian National Congress	257,809	29.82	30	▲30
Manipur Peoples Party	93,421	10.81	3	▼1
Janata Party	52,530	6.08	4	▼6
Communist Party of India	35,852	4.15	1	▼4
Indian Congress (Socialist)	28,156	3.26	0	New
Kuki National Assembly	13,367	1.55	1	▼1
Bharatiya Janata Party	6,163	0.71	0	New
Lok Dal	3,653	0.42	0	New
Communist Party of India (Marxist)	790	0.09	0	▼1
Independents	372,766	43.12	21	▲2
Total	864,507	100.00	60	0
Valid votes	864,507	97.70		
Invalid/blank votes	20,362	2.30		
Total votes	884,869	100.00		
Registered voters/turnout	1,013,680	87.29		
Source: ECI

=== Results by constituency ===
Winner, runner-up, voter turnout, and victory margin in every constituency
Assembly Constituency		Turnout	Winner				Runner Up				Margin
#k	Names	%	Candidate	Party	Votes	%	Candidate	Party	Votes	%	Margin
1	Khundrakpam	77.95%	Lairellakpam Lala	Independent	2,797	23.73%	Konsam Tomba	INC	2,263	19.20%	534
2	Heingang	88.66%	Waikhom Jagor Singh	INC	3,795	28.02%	Thoudam Kumar	MPP	2,967	21.91%	828
3	Khurai	86.45%	Atomba Ngairangbamcha	Independent	3,345	22.74%	Niagthoujam Radhamuhon	INC	2,344	15.93%	1,001
4	Kshetrigao	84.45%	Muhammddin Shah	INC	4,027	28.67%	Wangkhem Basantkumar	IC(S)	2,719	19.36%	1,308
5	Thongju	90.67%	Nameirakpam Bisheshwor	Independent	4,517	31.86%	Waikhom Tolen	MPP	2,412	17.01%	2,105
6	Keirao	90.95%	Abdul Matalip	INC	2,990	20.70%	Konthoujam Rajmani Singh	Independent	2,900	20.08%	90
7	Andro	92.89%	Loitongbam Amujou	INC	7,005	39.74%	Ashraf Ali	JP	4,818	27.33%	2,187
8	Lamlai	81.97%	Yumkhaibam Kerani Singh	INC	5,218	41.88%	Pheiroijam Parijat Singh	CPI	3,806	30.55%	1,412
9	Thangmeiband	76.44%	Koijam Radhabinod Singh	INC	5,826	43.61%	Ningthoujam Benoy Singh	Independent	3,281	24.56%	2,545
10	Uripok	79.42%	Paonam Achaou Singh	INC	2,883	30.86%	T. Gunadhwaja Singh	Independent	2,469	26.43%	414
11	Sagolband	77.66%	Salam Damodar Singh	Independent	2,562	22.20%	Moirangthem Kumar Singh	MPP	2,073	17.97%	489
12	Keishamthong	82.59%	Laisom Lalit Singh	INC	5,196	36.60%	Rajkumar Ranbir Singh	JP	4,571	32.20%	625
13	Singjamei	87.61%	Rengbam Tompok Singh	INC	4,860	42.18%	Thokchom Chandrsekhar	JP	3,278	28.45%	1,582
14	Yaiskul	82.15%	Rajkumar Dorendra Singh	INC	5,157	41.76%	Ayekpam Biramangol Singh	Independent	2,796	22.64%	2,361
15	Wangkhei	76.24%	Yumkham Erabot Singh	INC	7,901	47.46%	Ahmed Dullah Mirza	Independent	6,599	39.64%	1,302
16	Sekmai	84.20%	Khangembam Leirijao	INC	4,976	42.76%	Khwai Rakpam Chaoba	MPP	3,911	33.61%	1,065
17	Lamsang	89.43%	Mutum Deven	Independent	6,181	42.34%	Phuritsabam Sagor	Independent	3,259	22.32%	2,922
18	Konthoujam	91.43%	Henam Lokhon Singh	INC	3,449	23.19%	Heigrujam Thoithoi	Independent	3,270	21.98%	179
19	Patsoi	85.09%	Dr. Leishangthem Chandramani Singh	INC	3,792	28.26%	Nongthombam Ibomcha Singh	Independent	2,474	18.44%	1,318
20	Langthabal	86.15%	O. Joy Singh	MPP	7,203	58.64%	R. K. Bimol	INC	4,767	38.81%	2,436
21	Naoriya Pakhanglakpa	90.67%	Wahengbam Angou Singh	INC	5,033	30.91%	Akoijam Ibobi	MPP	4,130	25.37%	903
22	Wangoi	89.39%	Wahengbam Nipamacha Singh	JP	6,435	50.77%	Chungkham Rajmohan Singh	INC	5,583	44.04%	852
23	Mayang Imphal	83.88%	Meinam Nilchandra Singh	JP	5,426	35.13%	Khumukcham Amutombi	INC	4,957	32.09%	469
24	Nambol	94.13%	Thounaojam Chaoba Singh	INC	4,916	31.67%	Hidangmayum Shyakishor Sharma	Independent	4,870	31.37%	46
25	Oinam	94.65%	Keisham Bira Singh	INC	7,415	52.95%	Yamnam Yaima Singh	Independent	5,809	41.48%	1,606
26	Bishnupur	93.77%	Thiyam Udhop Singh	Independent	3,584	25.28%	R. K. Dhanachandra Singh	JP	3,324	23.45%	260
27	Moirang	86.37%	M. Koireng Singh	JP	4,660	27.83%	Mohammad Heshamuddin	MPP	4,634	27.68%	26
28	Thanga	92.47%	Heisnam Sanayaima Singh	Independent	2,628	23.42%	Salam Ibohal Singh	Independent	2,529	22.54%	99
29	Kumbi	89.95%	Sanasam Bira	Independent	2,615	20.21%	Khangembam Manimohan	INC	2,045	15.80%	570
30	Lilong	88.79%	Alauddin	MPP	4,369	27.80%	Md. Helaluddin Khan	INC	4,041	25.71%	328
31	Thoubal	88.16%	Leitanthem Tomba Singh	JP	5,316	32.91%	Thoudam Krishna Singh	INC	4,050	25.07%	1,266
32	Wangkhem	89.68%	Nahakpam Nimai Chand Luwang	Independent	4,193	26.13%	Ibotonm Mazid	MPP	3,119	19.44%	1,074
33	Heirok	90.61%	Moirangthem Tombi	INC	6,274	42.60%	Nongmeikapam Nilakamal	Independent	5,405	36.70%	869
34	Wangjing Tentha	89.47%	Moirangthem Nara Singh	CPI	3,079	19.59%	Sapam Ibocha Singh	Independent	2,599	16.53%	480
35	Khangabok	92.65%	Okram Ibobi Singh	Independent	4,157	25.32%	M. Borojao	Independent	3,303	20.12%	854
36	Wabgai	90.00%	Ma Yengbam Manihar	Independent	3,046	20.31%	Naorem Mohandas	Independent	2,954	19.70%	92
37	Kakching	89.93%	Yengkhom Thambal	Independent	4,741	34.75%	Kshetri Iraoji	CPI	3,885	28.48%	856
38	Hiyanglam	85.13%	Elangbam Biramani Singh	INC	3,831	28.04%	Maibam Kunjo	Independent	3,651	26.72%	180
39	Sugnu	92.00%	Mayanglambam Babu Singh	INC	4,178	28.70%	Loitongbam Ibomcha Singh	Independent	3,101	21.31%	1,077
40	Jiribam	78.66%	Devendra Singh	INC	7,172	56.37%	S. Bijoy	Independent	4,360	34.27%	2,812
41	Chandel	92.98%	H. T. Thungam	Independent	4,535	21.63%	Paokhhang	KNA	4,110	19.60%	425
42	Tengnoupal	88.84%	Jainson Haokip	Independent	7,525	40.36%	Morung Makunga	INC	6,885	36.93%	640
43	Phungyar	74.82%	Rishang Keishing	INC	6,881	52.39%	A. Stephen	IC(S)	5,389	41.03%	1,492
44	Ukhrul	80.39%	A. S. Arthur	Independent	3,916	23.88%	Lungshim Shaiza	Independent	3,871	23.61%	45
45	Chingai	81.97%	R. V. Mingthing	INC	5,348	32.99%	J. Khathing	Independent	5,296	32.67%	52
46	Saikul	94.04%	Holkholet Khongsai	Independent	6,515	35.24%	Ramthing Hungyo	INC	3,418	18.49%	3,097
47	Karong	93.06%	Benjamin Banee	Independent	7,370	31.33%	R. Vio	Independent	7,213	30.67%	157
48	Mao	92.04%	Lorho	INC	7,841	33.85%	Puni Beso	Independent	7,705	33.26%	136
49	Tadubi	92.94%	N. G. Luikang	INC	8,163	36.52%	Hangzing	Independent	7,086	31.70%	1,077
50	Kangpokpi	93.87%	Kishore Thapa	Independent	6,782	42.01%	Thangminlen Kipgen	Independent	3,686	22.83%	3,096
51	Saitu	92.09%	S. L. Paokhosei	INC	5,146	26.44%	Jampao Haokip	KNA	3,957	20.33%	1,189
52	Tamei	81.14%	I. D. Dijuanang	Independent	5,455	35.99%	N. Pouhe	INC	3,259	21.50%	2,196
53	Tamenglong	82.44%	Janghemlung Panmei	INC	5,035	43.15%	Ningthan Panmei	Independent	2,420	20.74%	2,615
54	Nungba	84.06%	Gaikhangam Gangmei	INC	6,484	53.08%	Gangmumei Kamei	Independent	5,508	45.09%	976
55	Tipaimukh	84.71%	Ngurdinglien Sanate	Independent	3,961	40.69%	Selkai Hrangchal	INC	3,630	37.29%	331
56	Thanlon	82.96%	T. Phungzathang	INC	4,801	41.41%	N. Gouzagin	Independent	2,979	25.70%	1,822
57	Henglep	92.18%	Sehpu Haokip	Independent	6,216	43.96%	Holkhmoang	INC	4,916	34.77%	1,300
58	Churachandpur	78.07%	J. F. Rothangliana	KNA	2,797	21.62%	K. Vungzalian	INC	2,707	20.93%	90
59	Saikot	92.36%	Ngulkhohao	MPP	5,005	35.35%	Lala Khobung	Independent	4,856	34.30%	149
60	Singhat	90.63%	T. Gouzadou	INC	6,567	51.10%	Thangkhanlal	Independent	4,683	36.44%	1,884

== See also ==
- List of constituencies of the Manipur Legislative Assembly
- 1984 elections in India
