= 2000 elections in India =

Elections in India
← 1999	2000	2001 →

Elections in the Republic of India in 2000 included elections to four state legislative assemblies.

== Overall result ==
Date(s)	State	Government before election	Chief Minister before election	Government after election	Chief Minister after election	Maps
12 to 22 February 2000	Bihar	Rashtriya Janata Dal	Rabri Devi	Rashtriya Janata Dal	Rabri Devi	
22 February 2000	Haryana	Indian National Lok Dal	Om Prakash Chautala	Indian National Lok Dal	Om Prakash Chautala	
12 and 22 February 2000	Manipur	Manipur State Congress Party	Wahengbam Nipamacha Singh	Manipur State Congress Party	Wahengbam Nipamacha Singh	
17 and 22 February 2000	Odisha	Indian National Congress	Hemananda Biswal	Biju Janata Dal	Naveen Patnaik	

== Legislative Assembly elections ==
=== Bihar ===
The Bihar legislative assembly election, 2000 was held on year 2000 for Bihar Legislative Assembly. Rashtriya Janata Dal won 103 seats in election and form the government.

Party	Seats
Bharatiya Janata Party	67
Bahujan Samaj Party	05
Communist Party of India	05
Communist Party of India (Marxist)	02
Indian National Congress	23
Janata Dal (United)	21
Communist Party of India (Marxist-Leninist) Liberation	06
Jharkhand Mukti Morcha	12
Rashtriya Janata Dal	124
Samata Party	34
United Goans Democratic Party	02
Kosal Party	02
Marxist Co-ordination Committee	01
Independent	20
Total	324

=== Haryana ===
The Haryana legislative assembly election, 2000 was held on 22 February 2000, to select the 90 members of the Haryana Legislative Assembly.

SN	Party	No. of candidates	No. of elected	No. of votes %
1	Indian National Lok Dal	62	47	29.61
2	Indian National Congress	90	21	31.22
3	Bharatiya Janata Party	29	6	8.94
4	Bahujan Samaj Party	83	1	5.74
5	Nationalist Congress Party	24	1	0.51
6	Vishal Haryana Party	82	2	5.55
7	Republican Party of India	5	1	0.62
8	Independents	519	11	16.90
	Total:		90	

=== Manipur ===
Party	Votes	%	Seats	+/–
Manipur State Congress Party	331,141	26.28	23	New
Indian National Congress	230,748	18.31	11	–11
Bharatiya Janata Party	142,174	11.28	6	+5
Federal Party of Manipur	118,916	9.44	6	+4
Manipur Peoples Party	99,487	7.90	4	–14
Nationalist Congress Party	99,128	7.87	5	New
Samata Party	84,215	6.68	1	–2
Communist Party of India	45,309	3.60	0	–2
Rashtriya Janata Dal	23,037	1.83	1	New
Janata Dal (United)	22,576	1.79	1	New
Janata Dal (Secular)	19,945	1.58	1	New
Communist Party of India (Marxist)	3,783	0.30	0	0
Revolutionary Socialist Party	1,050	0.08	0	New
Kuki National Assembly	690	0.05	0	0
National People's Party	17	0.00	0	–2
Independents	37,875	3.01	1	–2
Total	1,260,091	100.00	60	0
Valid votes	1,260,091	99.07		
Invalid/blank votes	11,849	0.93		
Total votes	1,271,940	100.00		
Registered voters/turnout	1,415,933	89.83		
Source: ECI

=== Odisha ===
Party	Votes	%	Seats	+/–
Indian National Congress	4,770,654	33.77	26	–54
Biju Janata Dal	4,151,895	29.39	68	New
Bharatiya Janata Party	2,570,074	18.19	38	+29
Jharkhand Mukti Morcha	301,729	2.14	3	–1
Communist Party of India	172,398	1.22	1	0
Janata Dal (Secular)	118,978	0.84	1	New
All India Trinamool Congress	110,056	0.78	1	New
Communist Party of India (Marxist)	109,256	0.77	1	+1
Others	314,186	2.22	0	0
Independents	1,506,216	10.66	8	+2
Total	14,125,442	100.00	147	0
Valid votes	14,125,442	98.82		
Invalid/blank votes	169,311	1.18		
Total votes	14,294,753	100.00		
Registered voters/turnout	24,188,320	59.10		
Source: ECI

== Legislative By-elections ==
=== Himachal Pradesh ===
2000 Himachal Pradesh Legislative Assembly by-election : Solan
Party	Candidate	Votes	%	±%
Republican Janata Party	Dr. Rajeev Bindal	15,042	40.00%	New
INC	Major Krishna Mohini	11,505	30.59%	▼2.97
Independent	Netar Singh	11,059	29.41%	New
Margin of victory		3,537	9.41%	▲9.33
Turnout		37,606	60.92%	▼4.59
Registered electors		62,057		▲11.20
Republican Janata Party gain from INC		Swing		
