= Chandel Assembly constituency =

Legislative Assembly constituency in Manipur State, India

Coordinates: 24.32°N 94.00°E

Chandel
- Constituency for the Manipur Legislative Assembly

Constituency details
- Country: India
- Region: Northeast India
- State: Manipur
- District: Chandel
- Lok Sabha constituency: Outer Manipur
- Established: 1972
- Total electors: 50,378
- Reservation: ST

Member of Legislative Assembly
- 12th Manipur Legislative Assembly
- Incumbent SS. Olish
- Party: Bharatiya Janata Party
- Elected year: 2022

Chandel is one of the 60 Vidhan Sabha constituencies in the Indian state of Manipur.

== Members of the Legislative Assembly ==
Year	Member	Party
1972	H. T. Thungam	Independent politician
1974	H. T. Thungam	Manipur Hills Union
1980	Satkholal	Kuki National Assembly
1984	H. T. Thungam	Independent politician
1990	B. D. Behring	Janata Dal
1995	T. Hangkhanpau	Janata Dal
2000	T. Hangkhanpau	Rashtriya Janata Dal
2002	B. D. Behring	Bharatiya Janata Party
2007	Thangkholun Haokip	Rashtriya Janata Dal
2012	St. Nunghlung Victor	Naga People's Front
2017	Letpao Haokip	National People's Party
2022	Olish Shilshi	Bharatiya Janata Party

== Election results ==
Vote share of winning candidates
2022	79.06%
2017	33.58%
2012	37.37%
2007	44.17%
2002	64.71%
2000	39.28%
1995	45.43%
1990	25.41%
1984	22.04%
1980	33.81%
1974	24.45%
1972	59.29%

=== 2027 Assembly election ===
2027 Manipur Legislative Assembly election: Chandel
Party	Candidate	Votes	%	±%
INC				
NDA				
NOTA	None of the above			
Majority				
Turnout				
gain from		Swing		

=== 2022 Assembly election ===
2022 Manipur Legislative Assembly election: Chandel
Party	Candidate	Votes	%	±%
BJP	Olish Shilshi	37,066	79.06%	▲55.81
NPF	Langhu Paulhring Anal	9,725	20.74%	▲17.03
NOTA	None of the Above	91	0.19%	▼0.19
Margin of victory		27,341	58.32%	▲53.30
Turnout		46,882	93.06%	▲4.02
Registered electors		50,378		▲5.96
BJP gain from NPP		Swing	▲45.48	

=== 2017 Assembly election ===
2017 Manipur Legislative Assembly election: Chandel
Party	Candidate	Votes	%	±%
NPP	Letpao Haokip	14,216	33.58%	New
Independent	T. S. Warngam	12,091	28.56%	New
BJP	S. S. Olish	9,842	23.25%	New
People's Democratic Alliance	B. D. Behring	3,044	7.19%	New
NPF	St. Victor Nunghlung	1,574	3.72%	▼33.66
INC	Chungjalen Haokip	1,185	2.80%	▼34.11
AITC	Thangkholun Haokip	221	0.52%	New
NOTA	None of the Above	163	0.39%	New
Margin of victory		2,125	5.02%	▲4.55
Turnout		42,336	89.04%	▲9.40
Registered electors		47,545		▲6.22
NPP gain from NPF		Swing	▼3.80	

=== 2012 Assembly election ===
2012 Manipur Legislative Assembly election: Chandel
Party	Candidate	Votes	%	±%
NPF	St. Nunghlung Victor	13,324	37.37%	New
INC	Thangkholun Haokip	13,158	36.91%	New
Independent	S. S. Olish	5,512	15.46%	New
JD(U)	Chungjalen Haokip	1,658	4.65%	New
Independent	Ws Kanral	1,548	4.34%	New
CPI	D. N. Haokip	284	0.80%	New
Margin of victory		166	0.47%	▼24.53
Turnout		35,650	79.64%	▼12.60
Registered electors		44,762		▲4.67
NPF gain from RJD		Swing	▼6.80	

=== 2007 Assembly election ===
2007 Manipur Legislative Assembly election: Chandel
Party	Candidate	Votes	%	±%
RJD	Thangkholun Haokip	17,424	44.17%	New
Independent	L. Benjamin	7,563	19.17%	New
Independent	Francis Huten	7,519	19.06%	New
Independent	D. Ringo	4,825	12.23%	New
Independent	S. T. Feo Kolari	1,928	4.89%	New
Margin of victory		9,861	25.00%	▼15.24
Turnout		39,448	92.25%	▼3.58
Registered electors		42,764		▲13.97
RJD gain from BJP		Swing	▼20.41	

=== 2002 Assembly election ===
2002 Manipur Legislative Assembly election: Chandel
Party	Candidate	Votes	%	±%
BJP	B. D. Behring	23,219	64.58%	▲61.31
MSCP	T. Chungsei Haokip	8,750	24.34%	▼9.00
MPP	Pr Silanki	3,797	10.56%	New
Margin of victory		14,469	40.24%	▲34.79
Turnout		35,956	95.83%	▼0.82
Registered electors		37,521		▲6.67
BJP gain from RJD		Swing		

=== 2000 Assembly election ===
2000 Manipur Legislative Assembly election: Chandel
Party	Candidate	Votes	%	±%
RJD	Hangkhanpao	13,187	38.79%	New
MSCP	B. D. Behring	11,333	33.34%	New
INC	Kl. Rocky	6,440	18.94%	New
BJP	Thangkholun (Chakp Imolbem)	1,109	3.26%	New
JD(U)	Chungjalen	646	1.90%	New
Independent	Silanki Chothe	603	1.77%	New
CPI	Nehkhothang	185	0.54%	New
Margin of victory		1,854	5.45%	▼3.45
Turnout		33,996	96.65%	▲2.20
Registered electors		35,176		▲15.21
RJD gain from JD		Swing	▼6.40	

=== 1995 Assembly election ===
1995 Manipur Legislative Assembly election: Chandel
Party	Candidate	Votes	%	±%
JD	Hangkhanpao	13,030	45.19%	▲19.96
FPM	L. Benjamin	10,464	36.29%	New
SAP	Kl. Rocky	4,868	16.88%	New
Margin of victory		2,566	8.90%	▲8.82
Turnout		28,836	94.45%	▼0.37
Registered electors		30,531		▲9.79
JD hold		Swing		

=== 1990 Assembly election ===
1990 Manipur Legislative Assembly election: Chandel
Party	Candidate	Votes	%	±%
JD	B. D. Behring	6,653	25.23%	New
INC	H. T. Thungam	6,633	25.16%	▲11.52
INS(SCS)	Paokhohang Haokip	5,793	21.97%	New
Manipur Hill People'S Council	Richard Pashel	3,068	11.64%	New
Independent	Satkholal	2,357	8.94%	New
KNA	D. Sonkhojang	1,414	5.36%	▼14.24
MPP	Angking Khumlo	264	1.00%	New
Margin of victory		20	0.08%	▼1.95
Turnout		26,368	94.82%	▲1.84
Registered electors		27,808		▲23.33
JD gain from Independent		Swing	▲3.60	

=== 1984 Assembly election ===
1984 Manipur Legislative Assembly election: Chandel
Party	Candidate	Votes	%	±%
Independent	H. T. Thungam	4,535	21.63%	New
KNA	Paokhhang	4,110	19.60%	▼13.63
IC(S)	B. D. Behring	3,874	18.48%	New
Independent	Satkholal	3,467	16.54%	New
INC	L. Angno	2,859	13.64%	New
Independent	Letkholal	1,574	7.51%	New
Independent	Yamkhongam	139	0.66%	New
Margin of victory		425	2.03%	▼13.42
Turnout		20,965	92.98%	▲6.10
Registered electors		22,548		▲7.19
Independent gain from KNA		Swing	▼11.61	

=== 1980 Assembly election ===
1980 Manipur Legislative Assembly election: Chandel
Party	Candidate	Votes	%	±%
KNA	Satkholal	6,075	33.24%	New
INC(I)	Lh. Angno	3,251	17.79%	New
JP	H. T. Thungam	3,133	17.14%	New
Independent	Thangjalet	2,065	11.30%	New
Independent	Shekarnong Sankhil	1,716	9.39%	New
JP(S)	Runshung	1,462	8.00%	New
Independent	Mk. Angam	264	1.44%	New
Margin of victory		2,824	15.45%	▲14.16
Turnout		18,277	86.88%	▼3.13
Registered electors		21,036		▲31.09
KNA gain from Manipur Hills Union		Swing	▲9.08	

=== 1974 Assembly election ===
1974 Manipur Legislative Assembly election: Chandel
Party	Candidate	Votes	%	±%
Manipur Hills Union	H. T. Thungam	3,490	24.16%	New
INC	Nula Thumsing	3,303	22.87%	▼17.23
Independent	Linus Linakhohao	2,812	19.47%	New
Independent	Paokhohang Haokip	2,626	18.18%	New
Independent	Shetwor Lamkang	2,041	14.13%	New
Margin of victory		187	1.29%	▼17.01
Turnout		14,444	90.01%	▲13.65
Registered electors		16,047		▲18.02
Manipur Hills Union gain from Independent		Swing	▼34.24	

=== 1972 Assembly election ===
1972 Manipur Legislative Assembly election: Chandel
Party	Candidate	Votes	%	±%
Independent	H. T. Thungam	6,064	58.40%	New
INC	Linus Liankhohao	4,163	40.09%	New
Margin of victory		1,901	18.31%	
Turnout		10,383	76.36%	
Registered electors		13,597		
Independent win (new seat)				

== See also ==
- Manipur Legislative Assembly
- List of constituencies of Manipur Legislative Assembly
- Chandel district
