= 1974 elections in India =

Elections in India
- 1974 bye election

== Overall Results ==
Date(s)	State	Government before election	Chief Minister before election	Government after election	Chief Minister after election	Maps
12–16 February 1974	Nagaland	Nagaland Nationalist Organisation	Hokishe Sema	United Democratic Front (Nagaland)	Vizol Koso	
19–25 February 1974	Manipur	President's Rule		Manipur People's Party	Mohammed Alimuddin	
24 February 1974	Pondicherry	President's Rule		All India Anna Dravida Munnetra Kazhagam	S. Ramassamy	
24 and 26 February 1974	Uttar Pradesh	Indian National Congress	Hemwati Bahuguna	Indian National Congress (R)	Hemwati Bahuguna	
	Odisha	Indian National Congress (R)	Nandini Satpathy	Indian National Congress (R)	Nandini Satpathy	

== Legislative Assembly elections ==
=== Manipur ===
Party	Votes	%	Seats	+/–
Indian National Congress	164,717	27.62	13	–4
Manipur Peoples Party	134,493	22.55	20	+5
Manipur Hills Union	55,879	9.37	12	New
Socialist Party	35,349	5.93	2	–1
Communist Party of India	33,039	5.54	6	+1
Kuki National Assembly	17,592	2.95	2	New
Indian National Congress (Organisation)	8,764	1.47	0	–1
Communist Party of India (Marxist)	3,347	0.56	0	0
Independents	143,241	24.02	5	–14
Total	596,421	100.00	60	0
Valid votes	596,421	97.91		
Invalid/blank votes	12,701	2.09		
Total votes	609,122	100.00		
Registered voters/turnout	719,971	84.60		
Source: ECI

=== Nagaland ===
Party	Votes	%	Seats	+/–
Nagaland Nationalist Organisation	103,515	35.71	23	+1
United Democratic Front	87,005	30.01	25	New
Independents	99,379	34.28	12	+4
Total	289,899	100.00	60	+20
Valid votes	289,899	97.40		
Invalid/blank votes	7,731	2.60		
Total votes	297,630	100.00		
Registered voters/turnout	400,322	74.35		
Source: ECI

=== Odisha ===
Party	No. of candidates	No. of elected	No. of votes	%
Indian National Congress (Indira)	135	69	2152818	37.44%
Utkal Congress	95	35	1521064	26.45%
Swatantra Party	56	21	694473	12.08%
Communist Party of India	14	7	279738	4.87%
Socialist Party	17	2	101789	1.77%
Communist Party of India (Marxist)	8	3	67600	1.18%
Orissa Jana Congress	42	1	67169	1.17%
Jharkhand Party	12	1	34786	0.60%
Indian National Congress (Organization)	17	0	29103	0.51%
Bharatiya Jana Sangh	12	0	23335	0.41%
All India Jharkhand Party	8	0	15360	0.27%
Socialist Unity Centre of India	4	0	10214	0,18%
All India Forward Bloc	2	0	1080	0.02%
Revolutionary Communist Party of India	1	0	478	0.01%
Independents	299	7	750818	13.06%
Total:	722	146	5749825	

=== Pondicherry ===
Party	Votes	%	Seats	+/–
All India Anna Dravida Munnetra Kazhagam	60,812	27.83	12	New
Dravida Munnetra Kazhagam	47,823	21.89	2	–13
Indian National Congress (Organisation)	41,348	18.92	5	New
Indian National Congress	34,840	15.95	7	–3
Communist Party of India	18,468	8.45	2	–1
Communist Party of India (Marxist)	2,737	1.25	1	+1
Independents	12,470	5.71	1	–1
Total	218,498	100.00	30	0
Valid votes	218,498	96.97		
Invalid/blank votes	6,830	3.03		
Total votes	225,328	100.00		
Registered voters/turnout	264,103	85.32		
Source: ECI

=== Uttar Pradesh ===
Party	Votes	%	Seats	+/–
Indian National Congress	8,868,229	32.29	215	+4
Bharatiya Kranti Dal	5,826,256	21.22	106	+8
Bharatiya Jana Sangh	4,701,972	17.12	61	+12
Indian National Congress (Organisation)	2,296,883	8.36	10	New
Socialist Party (India)	795,770	2.90	5	New
Communist Party of India	672,881	2.45	16	+12
Indian Union Muslim League	378,221	1.38	1	New
Swatantra Party	311,669	1.13	1	–4
Communist Party of India (Marxist)	194,257	0.71	2	+1
Shoshit Samaj Dal	190,259	0.69	1	New
Hindu Mahasabha	81,829	0.30	1	0
Others	327,246	1.19	0	0
Independents	2,815,747	10.25	5	–13
Total	27,461,219	100.00	424	–1
Valid votes	27,461,219	97.00		
Invalid/blank votes	849,448	3.00		
Total votes	28,310,667	100.00		
Registered voters/turnout	49,743,193	56.91		
Source: ECI
