= D Korungthang =

Indian politician

Member of the Manipur Legislative Assembly
- In office 2012–2022
- Preceded by: W Morung Makunga
- Succeeded by: Letpao Haokip
- Constituency: Tengnoupal

Personal details
- Born: 1958 (age 67–68)
- Party: Naga People's Front (2022- ) Indian National Congress (2012-2022)
- Parent: Angkhul (father)
- Profession: Social Worker

D Korungthang is a politician from Maring tribe of Manipur, India. He was elected from Tengnoupal Assembly constituency in the 2012 and 2017 elections to the Manipur Legislative Assembly from Indian National Congress. He had also served briefly as Cabinet Minister in the Government of Manipur from 2016 to 2017.
