= W Morung Makunga =

Indian politician

Wairok Morung Makunga

Member of the Manipur Legislative Assembly
- In office 2007–2012
- Preceded by: D Korungthang
- Succeeded by: D Korungthang
- Constituency: Tengnoupal

Personal details
- Born: 1952 (age 73–74)
- Party: Indian National Congress
- Parent: wairok Angkham (father)
- Education: B.A.
- Alma mater: Patkai Christian College, NEHU
- Profession: Social Worker

Wairok Morung Makunga is a politician from Maring tribe of Manipur state in India. He was elected from Tengnoupal Assembly constituency 3 times in 1990, 1995 and 2007 Manipur Legislative Assembly election and has also served briefly as Cabinet Minister in Manipur Legislative Assembly.
