= Hangmila Shaiza =

Indian politician

Member of the Indian Parliament for Legislative Assembly of Manipur

Personal details
- Born: Hangmila Kashung; 19 September 1920
- Died: 3 August 1997 (aged 76) Ukhrul District, Manipur, India
- Party: Janata Party (JP)
- Spouse: Yangmaso Shaiza (m. 1949; died 1984)
- Children: 6

Hangmila Shaiza (19 September 1920 – 3 August 1997) was an Indian politician who was the first woman to be elected to the Legislative Assembly of Manipur. She served from 1990 to 1991, representing the Ukhrul Assembly constituency.

Shaiza first became involved in politics in the aftermath of the assassination of her husband, Yangmaso Shaiza, who was the Chief Minister of Manipur in 1984.
