= Olish Shilshi =

Indian politician

SS. Olish

Member of the Manipur Legislative Assembly
- Incumbent
- Assumed office 2022
- Preceded by: Letpao Haokip
- Constituency: Chandel

Personal details
- Born: Olish Shilshi; 1977 (age 48–49)
- Party: Bharatiya Janata Party
- Parent: SS. Mohring (father)
- Education: B.A. (Pol. Science)
- Alma mater: Manipur University
- Profession: Social Worker

Olish Shilshi or S. S. Olish is an Indian politician from Manipur. She was elected from Chandel Assembly constituency in 2022 Manipur Legislative Assembly election and became first from Lamkang tribe and second Naga woman to be elected to Manipur Legislative Assembly.
