= Chief Minister of Manipur =

Leader of the executive branch of Government of Manipur

- Emblem of Manipur

- Flag of India

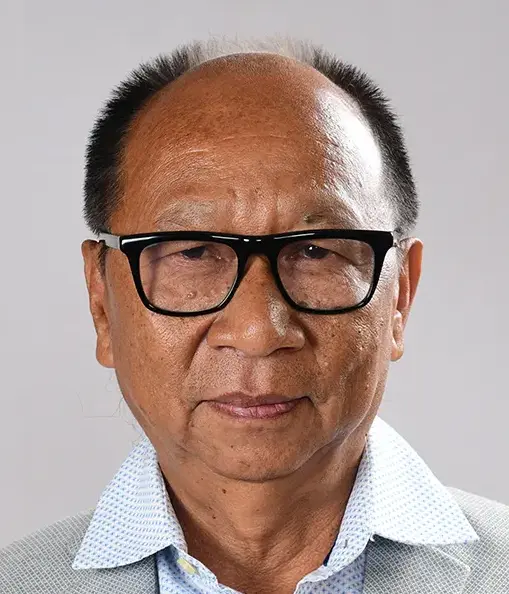
- Incumbent; Yumnam Khemchand Singh since 4 February 2026
- Chief Minister's Office; Government of Manipur
- Style: The Honourable (formal); Mr. Chief Minister (informal)
- Type: Leader of the Executive
- Status: Head of government
- Abbreviation: CMoManipur
- Member of: Legislative Assembly; State Cabinet
- Reports to: Governor of Manipur; Manipur Legislative Assembly
- Seat: Imphal
- Nominator: MLAs of the majority party or alliance
- Appointer: Governor of Manipur; by convention based on appointees ability to command confidence in the Legislative Assembly
- Term length: At the confidence of the assembly; Chief minister's term is for five years and is subject to no term limits.
- Inaugural holder: Mairembam Koireng Singh
- Formation: 1 July 1963 (63 years ago)
- Deputy: Deputy chief minister of Manipur
- Salary: ₹120,000 (US$1,300) (
- Website: https://ditmanipur.gov.in/manipur-cm-dashboard/

The Chief Minister of Manipur is the chief executive of the Indian state of Manipur. As per the Constitution of India, the governor is a state's de jure head, but de facto executive authority rests with the chief minister. Following elections to the Manipur Legislative Assembly, the state's governor usually invites the party (or coalition) with a majority of seats to form the government. The governor appoints the chief minister, whose council of ministers is collectively responsible to the assembly. If they have the confidence of the assembly, the chief minister's term is for five years and is subject to no term limits. Usually, the chief minister also serves as leader of the house in the legislative assembly.

Since 1963, fourteen people have served as the chief minister of Manipur. Five of these belonged to the Indian National Congress, including the inaugural officeholder Mairembam Koireng Singh. Okram Ibobi Singh was the longest holder of the post and held the office for 15 years and 11 days. Yumnam Khemchand Singh of the Bharatiya Janata Party is the current incumbent, having taken charge on 4 February 2026.

== Chief Ministers of Manipur (1963-present) ==
- ^{†} Died in office
- ^{§} Returned to office after a previous non-consecutive term

#	Portrait	Chief Minister (Birth-Death) Constituency	Election	Term of office			Political party	Ministry
#	Portrait	Chief Minister (Birth-Death) Constituency	Election	From	To	Period	Political party	Ministry
Union territory of Manipur (1956–1972) (Note: After India’s independence, Manipur briefly had an elected government and a constitution in 1948. In 1949, the Maharaja of Manipur signed the Merger Agreement with India, and Manipur became part of the Indian Union on 15 October 1949. Initially, it was administered as a Part C State and later became a Union Territory in 1956.)
1		Mairembam Koireng Singh (1915–1994); MLA for Thanga	– (Interim)	1 July 1963	11 January 1967	3 years, 194 days	Indian National Congress	Mairembam I
Position vacant (12 January – 19 March 1967); President's rule was imposed during this period (Note: President's rule may be imposed when the "government in a state is not able to function as per the Constitution", which often happens because no party or coalition has a majority in the assembly. When President's rule is in force in a state, its council of ministers stands dissolved. The office of chief minister thus lies vacant, and the administration is taken over by the governor, who functions on behalf of the central government. At times, the legislative assembly also stands dissolved.)
(1)		Mairembam Koireng Singh (1915–1994); MLA for Thanga	1967 (1st)	20 March 1967^{[§]}	4 October 1967	198 days	Indian National Congress	Mairembam II
2		Longjam Thambou Singh; MLA for Keishamthong	1967 (1st)	4 October 1967	24 October 1967	20 days	Manipur United Front	Longjam
Position vacant (25 October 1967 – 18 February 1968); President's rule was imposed during this period
(1)		Mairembam Koireng Singh (1915–1994); MLA for Thanga	1967 (1st)	19 February 1968^{[§]}	16 October 1969	1 year, 239 days	Indian National Congress	Mairembam III
Position vacant (17 October 1969 – 20 January 1972); President's rule was imposed during this period
State of Manipur (1972–present) (Note: Due to growing political demands for greater autonomy and full democratic representation, the Government of India passed the North-Eastern Areas (Reorganisation) Act, 1971, which granted Manipur full statehood on 21 January 1972. On the same day, Meghalaya and Tripura also became states of India.)
Position vacant (21 January–22 March 1972) (Note: Continued since 17 October 1969.); President's rule was imposed during this period
1		Mohammed Alimuddin (1920–1983); MLA for Lilong	1972 (2nd)	23 March 1972	27 March 1973	1 year, 4 days	Manipur People's Party	Alimuddin I
Position vacant (28 March 1973–3 March 1974); President's rule was imposed during this period
2		Mohammed Alimuddin (1920–1983); MLA for Lilong	1974 (3rd)	4 March 1974^{[§]}	9 July 1974	127 days	Manipur People's Party	Alimuddin II
3		Yangmaso Shaiza (1930–1984); MLA for Ukhrul	1974 (3rd)	9 July 1974	5 December 1974	149 days	Manipur Hills Union	Shaiza I
4		Rajkumar Dorendra Singh (1934–2018); MLA for Yaiskul	1974 (3rd)	5 December 1974	15 May 1977	2 years, 161 days	Indian National Congress	Dorendra I
Position vacant (16 May–28 June 1977); President's rule was imposed during this period
5		Yangmaso Shaiza (1930–1984); MLA for Ukhrul	– (3rd)	29 June 1977^{[§]}	13 November 1979	2 years, 137 days	Janata Party	Shaiza II
Position vacant (14 November 1979–13 January 1980); President's rule was imposed during this period
6		Rajkumar Dorendra Singh (1934–2018); MLA for Yaiskul	1980 (4th)	14 January 1980^{[§]}	26 November 1980	317 days	Indian National Congress	Dorendra II
7		Rishang Keishing (1920–2017); MLA for Phungyar	1980 (4th)	27 November 1980	27 February 1981	92 days	Indian National Congress	Keishing I
Position vacant (28 February–28 June 1981); President's rule was imposed during this period
8		Rishang Keishing (1920–2017); MLA for Phungyar	– (4th)	19 June 1981^{[§]}	3 March 1988	6 years, 258 days	Indian National Congress	Keishing II
8		Rishang Keishing (1920–2017); MLA for Phungyar	1984 (5th)	19 June 1981^{[§]}	3 March 1988	6 years, 258 days	Indian National Congress	Keishing III
9		Rajkumar Jaichandra Singh (born 1942)	1984 (5th)	4 March 1988	22 February 1990	1 year, 355 days	Indian National Congress	Jaichandra
10		Rajkumar Ranbir Singh (1930–2006); MLA for Keishamthong	1990 (6th)	23 February 1990	6 January 1992	1 year, 317 days	Manipur People's Party	Ranbir
Position vacant (7 January–7 April 1992); President's rule was imposed during this period
11		Rajkumar Dorendra Singh (1934–2018); MLA for Yaiskul	– (6th)	8 April 1992^{[§]}	31 December 1993	1 year, 267 days	Indian National Congress	Dorendra III
Position vacant (31 December 1993–13 December 1994); President's rule was imposed during this period
12		Rishang Keishing (1920–2017); MLA for Phungyar	– (6th)	14 December 1994^{[§]}	15 December 1997	3 years, 1 day	Indian National Congress	Keishing IV
12		Rishang Keishing (1920–2017); MLA for Phungyar	1995 (7th)	14 December 1994^{[§]}	15 December 1997	3 years, 1 day	Indian National Congress	Keishing V
13		Wahengbam Nipamacha Singh (1930–2012); MLA for Wangoi	1995 (7th)	16 December 1997	14 February 2001	3 years, 60 days	Indian National Congress	Wahengbam I
13		Wahengbam Nipamacha Singh (1930–2012); MLA for Wangoi	2000 (8th)	16 December 1997	14 February 2001	3 years, 60 days	Manipur State Congress Party	Wahengbam II
14		Radhabinod Koijam (born 1948); MLA for Thangmeiband	2000 (8th)	15 February 2001	1 June 2001	106 days	Samata Party	Koijam
Position vacant (2 June 2001–6 March 2002); President's rule was imposed during this period
15		Okram Ibobi Singh (born 1948); MLA for Khangabok, until 2007; MLA for Thoubal, from 2007	2002 (8th)	7 March 2002	14 March 2017	15 years, 7 days	Indian National Congress	Okram I
15		Okram Ibobi Singh (born 1948); MLA for Khangabok, until 2007; MLA for Thoubal, from 2007	2007 (9th)	7 March 2002	14 March 2017	15 years, 7 days	Indian National Congress	Okram II
15		Okram Ibobi Singh (born 1948); MLA for Khangabok, until 2007; MLA for Thoubal, from 2007	2012 (10th)	7 March 2002	14 March 2017	15 years, 7 days	Indian National Congress	Okram III
16		Nongthombam Biren Singh (born 1961); MLA for Heingang	2017 (11th)	15 March 2017	13 February 2025	7 years, 335 days	Bharatiya Janata Party	Nongthombam I
16		Nongthombam Biren Singh (born 1961); MLA for Heingang	2022 (12th)	15 March 2017	13 February 2025	7 years, 335 days	Bharatiya Janata Party	Nongthombam II
Position vacant (13 February 2025– 4 February 2026); President's rule was imposed during this period
17		Yumnam Khemchand Singh (born 1963); MLA for Singjamei	2022 (12th)	4 February 2026	Incumbent	248 days	Bharatiya Janata Party	Yumnam

== Statistics ==
#	Chief Minister	Party	Term of office	
#	Chief Minister	Party	Longest continuous term	Total duration of chief ministership
1	Okram Ibobi Singh	INC	15 years, 11 days	15 years, 11 days
2	Rishang Keishing	INC	6 years, 258 days	9 years, 351 days
3	N. Biren Singh	BJP	7 years, 335 days	7 years, 335 days
4	Mairembam Koireng Singh	INC	3 years, 194 days	5 years, 266 days
5	Rajkumar Dorendra Singh	INC	2 years, 160 days	4 years, 114 days
6	Wahengbam Nipamacha Singh	MSCP	3 years, 60 days	3 years, 60 days
7	Yangmaso Shaiza	MHU/JP	2 year, 137 days	2 year, 285 days
8	Rajkumar Jaichandra Singh	INC	1 year, 355 days	1 year, 355 days
9	Rajkumar Ranbir Singh	MPP	1 year, 317 days	1 year, 317 days
10	Mohammed Alimuddin	MPP	1 year, 4 days	1 year, 131 days
11	Maharajkumar Priyobarta Singh	N/A	1 year, 0 days	1 year, 0 days
12	Yumnam Khemchand Singh	BJP	248 days	248 days
13	Radhabinod Koijam	SAP	106 days	106 days
14	Longjam Thambou Singh	MUF	11 days	11 days

== Notes ==
Footnotes

== Oath as the state chief minister ==
The chief minister serves five years in the office. The following is the oath of the chief minister of state:

I, <Name of Chief Minister>, do swear in the name of God/solemnly affirm that I will bear true faith and allegiance to the Constitution of India as by law established, that I will uphold the sovereignty and integrity of India, that I will faithfully and conscientiously discharge my duties as a Minister for the State of () and that I will do right to all manner of people in accordance with the Constitution and the law without fear or favour, affection or ill-will.

Oath of Secrecy

"I, [Name], do swear in the name of God / solemnly affirm that I will not directly or indirectly communicate or reveal to any person or persons any matter which shall be brought under my consideration or shall become known to me as a Minister for the State of [Name of State] except as may be required for the due discharge of my duties as such Minister.
