= People's Democratic Alliance (Manipur) =

Political party in India

- Abbreviation: PDA
- Leader: Bd. Behring Anal
- President: Bd. Behring Anal
- Secretary: Thaiba Sand
- Founded: 3 March 2012 (14 years ago)
- Headquarters: Ragailong, Imphal, Imphal East district, Manipur, India – 795 001
- ECI Status: State Party
- Alliance: National Democratic Alliance

Election symbol
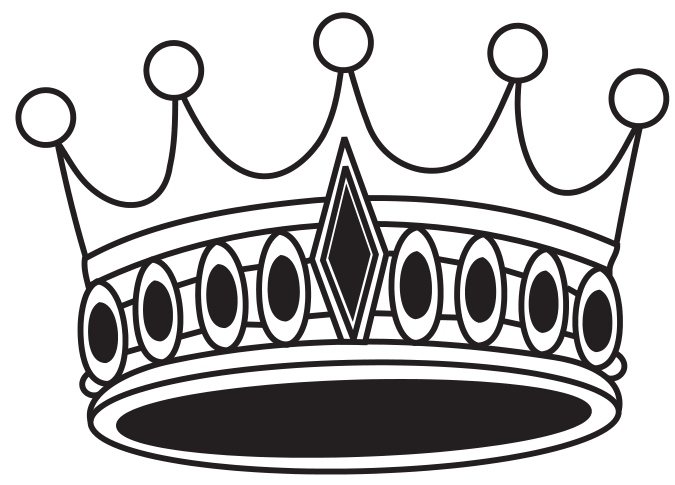
- Crown

People's Democratic Alliance is a political party in Manipur, India. The President and Leader of the party is Bd. Behring Anal. It is recognised as State Party in Manipur by the Election Commission of India.

== See also ==
- Political Parties in Manipur
