= Yangmaso Shaiza =

4th Chief Minister of Manipur, India

4th Chief Minister of Manipur
- In office July 1974 – December 1974
- In office June 1977 – November 1979

Personal details
- Born: 1923 Tarei (Now in Ukhrul District, Manipur, India)
- Died: 30 January 1984 (aged 62–63)
- Other political affiliations: Independent Candidate (1971–72); Manipur Hills Union or MHU (1973–74); Indian National Congress (1975–77); Janata Party (1977–1984)
- Spouse: Hangmila Shaiza (m. 1949)
- Children: 6
- Relatives: Shimreingam Shaiza (brother)
- Education: Scottish Church College, Calcutta

Yangmaso Shaiza (1923 – 30 January 1984) was an Indian politician and the Chief Minister of Manipur. He founded the Manipur Hills Union in 1974, and became the first chief minister from hill regions and hill tribes of Manipur.

== Manipur Hills Union ==
He formed Manipur Hills Union in 1974, it formed government in coalition with Manipur Peoples Party, he served as the chief minister from July 1974 to December of that same year. The Government was takenover by Indian National Congress, however Shaiza reclaimed the majority when his party and several of PPM's MLAs joined Janata Party.

== Death ==
On 30 January 1984, Yangmaso was murdered by two assassins of the National Socialist Council of Nagaland (NSCN) at Nagaram, Imphal.

== Legacy ==
As a far-sighted leader, Yangmaso and his policies has been considered as being highly visionary and cosmopolitan in nature. In a recent one-day seminar on "Yangmaso Shaiza and His Manipur" held on 9 March 2014 by the United All Communities Social Uplifters (UNACSU), Manipur, his legacy was summed up by Soso Shaiza as:

"As Chief Minister, he was convinced that the only way to maintain peace and harmony in the state was to reach out benefits to the remotest parts of the state and to bring development to both the hills and valleys, and to all tribes and communities. His vision was the accommodation and acceptance of all tribes and communities in Manipur. His dream was a rainbow concept of recognition and acceptance of the unique culture and character of all tribes and communities. For him, all human beings are brothers and sisters, since we are all children of God. His vision and ideals will be realised when all tribes and communities living in Manipur make his unity-rainbow concept a reality".
