= Ngurdinglien Sanate =

Indian politician

Member of Legislative Assembly in the 1972 Manipur Legislative Assembly, 1974 Manipur Legislative Assembly, 1980 Manipur Legislative Assembly, 1985 Manipur Legislative Assembly
- In office 1968–1984
- Constituency: Tipaimukh Assembly constituency

Personal details
- Born: 1938 Zawllien, Parbung, Pherzawl District, Manipur
- Died: 11 February 1991 (aged 52–53)
- Party: Indian National Congress, Janata Party, Independent
- Education: DM College

Ngurdinglien Sanate, or in short, Dinglien, was a former Minister of Manipur state in India, who was elected to the Manipur Legislative Assembly in the 1972, 1974, 1980, and 1984 elections. He also served as a Deputy Speaker of the Manipur Legislative Assembly during 1975–77. He is the father of incumbent Tipaimukh MLA and BJP member Ngursanglur Sanate. He was also briefly elected as an MLA in Churachandpur AC in the by-election term of 1968. He belonged to the Hmar tribe.

== Early life ==
Ngurdinglien was born and raised in Parbung, where he studied until his 6th standard there at NEIG.M.E. School. He completed his high school at Shillong and his college at DM College.

== Political career ==
Manipur Legislative Assembly (1968–1984)
Sl. No	Term	Status	Party	Constituency	Opponent(s)
1	1968 (By-Election)	Won	-	Ccpur AC	-
2	1972	Won	-	Tipaimukh AC	Selkai Hrangchal
3	1974	Won	-	Tipaimukh AC	Selkai Hrangchal
4	1980	Won	-	Tipaimukh AC	Selkai Hrangchal
5	1984	Won	-	Tipaimukh AC	Selkai Hrangchal
6	1990	Lost	-	Tipaimukh AC	Selkai Hrangchal
