= Tengnoupal Assembly constituency =

Legislative Assembly constituency in Manipur State, India

Coordinates: 24.38°N 94.15°E

Tengnoupal
- Constituency for the Manipur Legislative Assembly

Constituency details
- Country: India
- Region: Northeast India
- State: Manipur
- District: Chandel
- Lok Sabha constituency: Outer Manipur
- Established: 1967
- Total electors: 44,914
- Reservation: ST

Member of Legislative Assembly
- 12th Manipur Legislative Assembly
- Incumbent Vacant

Tengnoupal is one of the 60 Legislative Assembly constituencies of Manipur state in India.

It is part of Chandel district and is reserved for candidates belonging to the Scheduled Tribes.

== Members of the Legislative Assembly ==
Year	Member	Party
2007	W. Morung Makunga	Independent
2012	D. Korungthang	Indian National Congress
2017	D. Korungthang	Indian National Congress
2022	Letpao Haokip	Bharatiya Janata Party

== Election results ==
Vote share of winning candidates
2027	00.00%
2022	51.70%
2017	40.63%
2012	44.16%
2007	48.27%
2002	52.01%
2000	45.58%
1995	52.55%
1990	54.65%
1984	41.51%
1980	35.22%
1974	30.65%
1972	50.64%
1967	30.89%

=== 2027 Assembly election ===
2027 Manipur Legislative Assembly election: Tengnoupal
Party	Candidate	Votes	%	±%
INC				
NDA				
NOTA	None of the above			
Majority				
Turnout				
gain from		Swing		

=== Assembly Election 2022 ===
2022 Manipur Legislative Assembly election: Tengnoupal
Party	Candidate	Votes	%	±%
BJP	Letpao Haokip	21,663	51.70%	22.23%
NPF	D. Korungthang	15,252	36.40%	9.98%
INC	Wairok Morung Makunga	4,099	9.78%	−30.85%
Independent	Tantanga Kohai Moshilpha	777	1.85%	
Margin of victory		6,411	15.30%	4.13%
Turnout		41,902	93.29%	3.14%
Registered electors		44,914		−2.87%
BJP gain from INC		Swing	11.06%	

=== Assembly Election 2017 ===
2017 Manipur Legislative Assembly election: Tengnoupal
Party	Candidate	Votes	%	±%
INC	D. Korungthang	16,940	40.63%	−3.52%
BJP	Yangkholet Haokip	12,284	29.47%	14.39%
NPF	Khulpuwa Armstrong Charang	11,015	26.42%	4.05%
NPP	K. H. David Maring	1,300	3.12%	
Margin of victory		4,656	11.17%	−10.61%
Turnout		41,689	90.15%	28.64%
Registered electors		46,242		−6.50%
INC hold		Swing	-3.52%	

=== Assembly Election 2012 ===
2012 Manipur Legislative Assembly election: Tengnoupal
Party	Candidate	Votes	%	±%
INC	D. Korungthang	13,434	44.16%	36.79%
NPF	K. H. David Charanga	6,807	22.37%	
AITC	H. Shokhopao Mate	4,908	16.13%	
BJP	Jangkholet	4,586	15.07%	
CPI	T. Zangkhomang Haokip	458	1.51%	
MSCP	Onjamang Haokip	229	0.75%	
Margin of victory		6,627	21.78%	17.08%
Turnout		30,423	61.51%	−32.14%
Registered electors		49,457		4.45%
INC gain from Independent		Swing	-4.11%	

=== Assembly Election 2007 ===
2007 Manipur Legislative Assembly election: Tengnoupal
Party	Candidate	Votes	%	±%
Independent	Wairok Morung Makunga	21,408	48.27%	
RJD	Chungsei	19,321	43.57%	
INC	D. K. Korungthang	3,267	7.37%	
Margin of victory		2,087	4.71%	−0.18%
Turnout		44,349	93.66%	−5.11%
Registered electors		47,352		41.56%
Independent gain from SAP		Swing	-3.74%	

=== Assembly Election 2002 ===
2002 Manipur Legislative Assembly election: Tengnoupal
Party	Candidate	Votes	%	±%
SAP	D.K. Korungthang	17,140	52.01%	33.27%
NCP	Onjamang Haokip	15,529	47.12%	1.55%
BJP	M. Yanglet	285	0.86%	
Margin of victory		1,611	4.89%	−7.84%
Turnout		32,954	98.77%	5.25%
Registered electors		33,451		4.74%
SAP gain from NCP		Swing	-0.54%	

=== Assembly Election 2000 ===
2000 Manipur Legislative Assembly election: Tengnoupal
Party	Candidate	Votes	%	±%
NCP	Onjamang Haokip	13,900	45.58%	
INC	Wairok Morung Makunga	10,018	32.85%	−19.70%
SAP	D.K. Korungthang	5,715	18.74%	
FPM	L. Ngamjathang	486	1.59%	
MSCP	Doukhomang Guite	378	1.24%	
Margin of victory		3,882	12.73%	6.15%
Turnout		30,497	96.20%	2.68%
Registered electors		31,936		18.91%
NCP gain from INC		Swing	-6.97%	

=== Assembly Election 1995 ===
1995 Manipur Legislative Assembly election: Tengnoupal
Party	Candidate	Votes	%	±%
INC	Wairok Morung Makunga	13,058	52.55%	−2.10%
MPP	Holkhomang Haokip	11,423	45.97%	
Independent	Silanki Chothe	368	1.48%	
Margin of victory		1,635	6.58%	−34.06%
Turnout		24,849	93.52%	2.69%
Registered electors		26,857		13.48%
INC hold		Swing	-2.10%	

=== Assembly Election 1990 ===
1990 Manipur Legislative Assembly election: Tengnoupal
Party	Candidate	Votes	%	±%
INC	Wairok Morung Makunga	11,626	54.65%	16.68%
INS(SCS)	Paokholun Haokip	2,981	14.01%	
KNA	Jainson Haokip	2,371	11.15%	
Independent	Ch. Ngamching	1,835	8.63%	
Independent	Rongman	1,604	7.54%	
JD	Luna Alias Lamtinlun	856	4.02%	
Margin of victory		8,645	40.64%	37.11%
Turnout		21,273	90.83%	1.99%
Registered electors		23,666		12.77%
INC gain from Independent		Swing	13.15%	

=== Assembly Election 1984 ===
1984 Manipur Legislative Assembly election: Tengnoupal
Party	Candidate	Votes	%	±%
Independent	Jainson Haokip	7,525	41.51%	
INC	Morung Makunga	6,885	37.98%	
MPP	K. Leithil	3,671	20.25%	
Margin of victory		640	3.53%	−7.22%
Turnout		18,130	88.84%	6.89%
Registered electors		20,986		16.65%
Independent gain from KNA		Swing	6.28%	

=== Assembly Election 1980 ===
1980 Manipur Legislative Assembly election: Tengnoupal
Party	Candidate	Votes	%	±%
KNA	Jainson Haokip	5,055	35.22%	
INC(I)	K. Leithil	3,512	24.47%	
Independent	R. Koshang	2,535	17.66%	
JP	L. Rongman	1,876	13.07%	
INC(U)	Holkhomang Haokip	1,232	8.58%	
Independent	C. R. Dearson	141	0.98%	
Margin of victory		1,543	10.75%	4.55%
Turnout		14,351	81.95%	0.96%
Registered electors		17,990		36.38%
KNA gain from Manipur Hills Union		Swing	4.58%	

=== Assembly Election 1974 ===
1974 Manipur Legislative Assembly election: Tengnoupal
Party	Candidate	Votes	%	±%
Manipur Hills Union	L. Rongman	3,207	30.65%	
INC	N. G. Hermashing	2,558	24.44%	−26.20%
Independent	Tomba Maring	2,519	24.07%	
Independent	Solim Baite	2,116	20.22%	
INC(O)	T. Chingkhangthang	65	0.62%	
Margin of victory		649	6.20%	−24.60%
Turnout		10,465	80.99%	12.44%
Registered electors		13,191		38.79%
Manipur Hills Union gain from INC		Swing	-20.00%	

=== Assembly Election 1972 ===
1972 Manipur Legislative Assembly election: Tengnoupal
Party	Candidate	Votes	%	±%
INC	L. Rongman	3,191	50.64%	47.36%
Independent	Solim Baite	1,250	19.84%	
Independent	Thongul	1,238	19.65%	
MPP	Kodun Maring	622	9.87%	
Margin of victory		1,941	30.80%	28.38%
Turnout		6,301	68.55%	19.85%
Registered electors		9,504		−46.96%
INC gain from Independent		Swing	19.76%	

=== Assembly Election 1967 ===
1967 Manipur Legislative Assembly election: Tengnoupal
Party	Candidate	Votes	%	±%
Independent	Paokhohang	2,603	30.89%	
Independent	K. Leithil	2,399	28.46%	
Independent	S. K. Neisheil	1,606	19.06%	
Independent	N. Mono	1,543	18.31%	
INC	K. Hrangbung	277	3.29%	
Margin of victory		204	2.42%	
Turnout		8,428	48.70%	
Registered electors		17,917		
Independent win (new seat)				

== See also ==
- List of constituencies of the Manipur Legislative Assembly
- Chandel district
