= O. Joy Singh =

Indian politician

Okram Joy Singh is the chief of the Manipur People's Party, a political party based in the Indian state of Manipur.

== Career ==
Joy was elected 6 times as Member of Legislative Assembly from Langthabal Assembly Constituency, namely in the 1974, 1980, 1984, 2000, 2002, and 2007 assembly elections.

In 2018 he joined Indian National Congress and in the 12th Manipur Assembly Election 2022 he contested as an INC candidate but lost to Karam Shyam Singh of the Bharatiya Janata Party.
