= Rajkumar Ranbir Singh =

8th Chief Minister of Manipur

Member of Manipur Legislative Assembly
- In office 1990–2000
- Preceded by: Laishom Lalit
- Succeeded by: L. Jayantakumar
- Constituency: Keishamthong

Chief Minister of Manipur
- In office 23 February 1990 – 6 January 1992
- Preceded by: Rajkumar Jaichandra Singh
- Succeeded by: Rajkumar Dorendra Singh
- Constituency: Keishamthong

Personal details
- Born: Rajkumar Ranbir Singh; 1930
- Died: 27 January 2006 (aged 75–76)
- Party: Manipur Peoples Party
- Other political affiliations: Indian National Congress; Bharatiya Janata Party

Rajkumar Ranbir Singh (1930 – 27 January 2006) also known as R. K. Ranbir Singh was a former Chief Minister of Manipur, India. He belonged to Manipur Peoples Party and Manipur's one-time royal family. He was the Chief Minister of Manipur from 1990 to 1992. He was elected to the Manipur Legislative Assembly from Keishamthong in the 1990 Manipur Legislative Assembly election as a member of the Manipur Peoples Party.

He introduced the Manipur Liquor Prohibition Act 1991, which banned liquor in the state of Manipur. He joined Bharatiya Janata Party along with P. Rathin.

He died on 27 January 2006 after a prolonged illness.
