= Mohammed Alimuddin =

3rd Chief Minister of Manipur

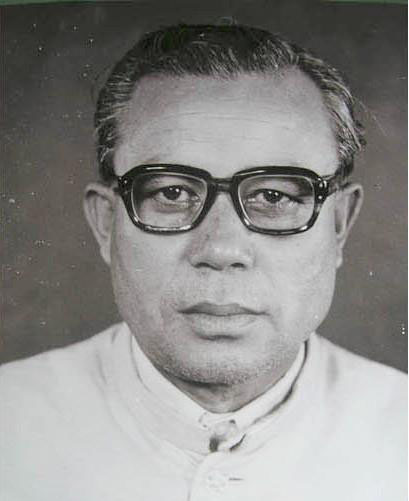

Chief Minister of Manipur
- In office March 23, 1972 – March 27, 1973
- Preceded by: President's rule
- Succeeded by: President's rule
- Constituency: Lilong

Chief Minister of Manipur
- In office March 4, 1974 – July 9, 1974
- Preceded by: President's rule
- Succeeded by: Yangmasho Shaiza
- Constituency: Lilong

Personal details
- Born: 1 January 1920 Lilong Turel Ahanbi, Lilong
- Died: 3 February 1983 (aged 62)
- Party: Manipur Peoples Party
- Spouse: Manera Begam
- Parent: Haji Md. Saheruddin (father)

Mohammed Alimuddin (1920 in Thoubal district – 3 February 1983) was an Indian politician and a former Chief Minister of Manipur. He succeeded Mairembam Koireng Singh, as the Chief Minister of Manipur in 1972–1973 (for 1 year, 4 days) and again in 1974 (for 127 days). He was a member of Manipur Peoples Party.

== Career ==
Alimuddin was elected to Lilong in first Legislative Assembly election held in 1948.

He also served as speaker in the Raj Kumar Dorendra Singh’s government as well as Finance Minister in the Yangmaso Shaiza’s ministry. During his period, the foundation was laid for Regional Institute of Medical Sciences, a premier medical college in Northeast India.
