= Letpao Haokip =

Indian politician

Member of the Manipur Legislative Assembly

Letpao Haokip is an Indian politician from the state of Manipur. He is currently a member of the Bharatiya Janata Party (BJP) and has served as the Minister of Tribal Affairs and Hills in the Government of Manipur headed by N. Biren Singh.

== Political career ==
Haokip was first elected to the Manipur Legislative Assembly in 2017 as a National People's Party (NPP) candidate from the Chandel constituency. NPP supported the Bharatiya Janata Party (BJP) for the formation of a minority government under N. Biren Singh, all its four winning candidates were appointed ministers. Haokip was appointed the Minister for Irrigation & Flood Control and Youth Affairs & Sports (2017–2022). In June 2020, all the four NPP ministers resigned from the Cabinet due to a row over the dilution of portfolios of the NPP leader and Deputy Chief Minister Y. Joykumar Singh. Biren Singh patched up the differences by reallocating portfolios. Letpao Haokip received the Water Resources portfolio after the reallocation.

In 2021, in the run up to the upcoming legislative assembly election, Haokip quit the NPP and joined the BJP. He won the election from the Tengnoupal Constituency as BJP candidate in 2022, and was appointed the Minister for Tribal Affairs & Hills as well as Horticulture & Soil Conservation.

He was one of the Kuki MLAs who frequently submitted MOUs to the Prime Minister of India, Home Minister of India and several international organizations for seeking a homeland for their community based on the concept of Survival Space of Nazi Germany.

=== Electoral history ===
- Elected MLA from 41 Chandel (ST) A/C, 11th Manipur Legislative Assembly 2017.
- Elected MLA from 42 Tengnoupal (ST) A/C, 12th Manipur Legislative Assembly 2022.
