= Kuki National Assembly =

- Abbreviation: KNA
- Founders: S. M. Zavum
- Founded: October 24, 1946; 79 years ago
- Headquarters: Grace Cottage, Paiteveng, Kwakelthel, P.O. Imphal, Manipur-795001.
- ECI Status: State party
- Seats in Manipur Legislative Assembly: 0 / 60

Election symbol

The Kuki National Assembly (KNA) is a political party in the Indian state of Manipur. It was formed on 24 October 1946, by S. M. Zavum, to act as a pan-political organisation among the various Kuki people. It last won seats in the 1990 Manipur Legislative Assembly election, and after that slowly fizzled out. In the 2022 Manipur Legislative Assembly election, the party fielded candidates for 2 constituencies.

== Electoral history ==
| Election | Seats won | Vote % | | MLA | Constituency | Source |
| Election | Seats won | Overall | In seats contested | MLA | Constituency | Source |
|---|---|---|---|---|---|---|
| 1974 | 2 / 60 | 2.95 | 25.79 | Zampu | Saitu | |
| 1974 | 2 / 60 | 2.95 | 25.79 | Ngulkhohao | Saikot | |
| 1980 | 2 / 60 | 2.82 | 21.36 | Satkholal | Chandel | |
| 1980 | 2 / 60 | 2.82 | 21.36 | Jainson Haokip | Tengnoupal | |
| 1984 | 1 / 60 | 1.55 | 19.93 | J. F. Rothangliana | Churachandpur | |
| 1990 | 2 / 60 | 2.61 | 15.42 | T. N. Haokip | Saikot | |
| 1990 | 2 / 60 | 2.61 | 15.42 | Thanghanlal | Singhat | |
| 1995 | 0 / 60 | 0.24 | 2.30 | | | |
| 2000 | 0 / 60 | 0.05 | 2.17 | | | |
KNA did not contest the elections from 2002 to 2017
| 2022 | 0 / 60 | 0.06 | 1.08 | | | |

== See also ==
- Political parties in Manipur
- Kuki People's Alliance
