= B. D. Behring =

Indian politician (1946–2025)

B. D. Behring (1 March 1946 – 27 June 2025) was an Indian politician from Manipur belonging to the Janata Dal party.

Behring was elected to the Manipur Legislative Assembly from Chandel constituency in 1990.

He was elected to the Rajya Sabha from 10 April 1990 from Manipur. However, he resigned immediately.

Behring resided at Khambathel Village near Sugnu. He died after a long illness at a hospital in Delhi, on 27 June 2025, at the age of 79.
