= Radhabinod Koijam =

10th Chief Minister of Manipur

10th Chief Minister of Manipur
- In office 15 February 2001 – 1 June 2001
- Governor: Ved Marwah
- Preceded by: Wahengbam Nipamacha Singh
- Succeeded by: Okram Ibobi Singh
- Constituency: Thangmeiband

Personal details
- Born: 19 July 1948 (age 78) Imphal, India
- Party: Bharatiya Janata Party
- Occupation: Politician

Radhabinod Koijam (born 19 July 1948) is an Indian politician from Manipur. He briefly served as the 10th Chief Minister of Manipur in 2001.

== Political career ==
In 1995, Koijam was elected to Manipur Legislative Assembly as Indian National Congress candidate. Later, he joined the Samata Party (now led by Uday Mandal).

Koijam was sworn in as Chief Minister of Manipur on 15 February 2001. The government was however, short-lived. The coalition he was leading fell in May the same year.

He was the president of the Nationalist Congress Party in Manipur. In 2007 he was elected to the Legislative Assembly of Manipur as a Nationalist Congress Party candidate from Thangmeiband Assembly Constituency.

In September 2015, Koijam changed his loyalties to Bharatiya Janata Party along with Okram Joy Singh and Yumnam Joykumar Singh looking forward for 2017 Manipur Legislative Assembly election. He is a current member of the Bharatiya Janata Party.

== Assembly election results ==
Year	Party	%	Result
2007	Nationalist Congress Party		Winner
2002	Samata Party	29.30%	2nd place
2000	Indian National Congress	33.43	Winner
1995	Indian National Congress	46.16	Winner
1990	Indian National Congress	39.10	2nd place
1984	Indian National Congress	44.73	Winner
1980	Independent	22.64	Winner
