= Wahengbam Nipamacha Singh =

9th Chief Minister of Manipur

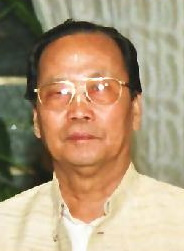

9th Chief Minister of Manipur
- In office 16 December 1997 – 14 February 2001
- Governor: Oudh Narayan Shrivastava; Ved Marwah
- Preceded by: Rishang Keishing
- Succeeded by: Radhabinod Koijam
- Constituency: Wangoi

Personal details
- Born: 17 December 1930
- Died: 17 July 2012 (aged 81) Imphal, Manipur, India

Wahengbam Nipamacha Singh (17 December 1930 – 17 July 2012) was chief Minister of the northeastern India state of Manipur. Nipamacha Singh became chief minister replacing Rishang Keishing from the Congress in 1997.

In 1997, he started the Manipur State Congress Party (MSCP) while he was the Speaker in the same year. Though he won the 2000 election for the second time, he was removed the very next year when President's rule was declared in the state. Saying, "It is a sin to be with a party that does not have any representation in [Central] Parliament. However powerful the party might be on home turf, it cannot raise Manipur’s problems in Parliament if it does not have any MP", he left the party. He formed the Manipur National Conference (MNC) in 2002. He lost his seat in the 2002 Assembly election.

In 2008, Singh joined the Bharatiya Janata Party (BJP), from Rashtriya Janata Dal. The MSCP later merged with the Congress in 2014. Before 2008, he was president of the RJD's Manipur unit.
