= Samata Party =

- Abbreviation: SAP
- President: Uday Mandal
- Founder: George Fernandes and Nitish Kumar
- Founded: 1994
- Split from: Janata Dal
- Merged into: Janata Dal (United) (factions)
- Student wing: Rashtra Nirman Vidyarthi Parishad (RNVP)
- Ideology: Socialism
- Political position: Centre to centre-left
- ECI Status: Unrecognised
- Alliance: National Democratic Alliance (1996–2003)
- Seats in Rajya Sabha: 0 / 245
- Seats in Lok Sabha: 0 / 543

Website
- samataparty.org

Samata Party (SAP) is a political party in India, initially formed in 1994 by George Fernandes and Nitish Kumar, and now led by Uday Mandal as its National President. Samata Party once launched Nitish Kumar as the Chief Minister of Bihar. It was an offshoot of the Janata Dal, with the alleged casteism of the parent party being the reason given for the split. The party has socialist leanings; at one point, it wielded considerable political and social influence in North India, particularly in Bihar. In 2003, most Samata Party members joined Janata Dal (United). Only a faction led by MP Brahmanand Mandal remained in Samata Party and continued to use the party name and symbol.

== History ==
In the general elections of 1996, the Samata Party formed an alliance with the Bharatiya Janta Party and won eight seats, six of which were in Bihar and one each in Uttar Pradesh and Odisha. Before the election, the party was largely rooted only in Bihar. In the 1998 general elections, again in alliance with Bharatiya Janta Party, it won twelve seats, ten from Bihar and two from Uttar Pradesh.

In March 2000, Nitish Kumar was elected leader of the NDA for Chief Minister of Bihar post. On 3 March, he was sworn in as the Chief Minister of Bihar for the first time at the behest of the Vajpayee Government in the center. NDA and allies had 151 MLA whereas Lalu Prasad Yadav had 159 MLA in the 324-member house. Both alliances were less than the majority mark, 163. Nithish resigned because he could not prove his numbers in the house.

Radhabinod Koijam became the second chief minister from Samata Party when was sworn in as Chief Minister of Manipur on 15 February 2001. The government was, however, short-lived. The coalition he was leading fell in May of the same year.

In the 1999 Loksabha election, Samata Party was in an informal alliance with the Lok Shakti and the Janata Dal(U). A proposal to merge the three into a single party was called off in January 2000 by George Fernandes who said the party would contest in the 2000 Bihar Legislative Assembly election on its own.

=== 2003 Split and merger with JD (U) ===
In October 2003, George Fernandes, the president of the Samata Party, announced that the party would be completely merging with the Janata Dal (United). The Janata Dal (United) was part of the ruling coalition in the National Democratic Alliance.

Samata Party Member of parliament (Lok Sabha) Brahmanand Mandal was opposed to the merger split with the other members. Mandal was the leader of the minority faction opposing the merger. Since all the members did not support the official merge, and Brahmanand's faction challenged the merger of the party in front of ECI, the merger wasn't officially recognized by the Election Commission of India. The Election Commission of India decided that the merger was not technically complete and so a faction was allowed to function under the Samata Party name.

Party leader Sharad Yadav, said that the ECI decision would have no effect on his merger plans as all candidates of Samata Party would be contesting the upcoming 2004 Lok Sabha election as candidate of Janata Dal United on the election symbol of Arrow.

Most members of the party merged with JDU as proposed however a small faction of Samata Party continued using the name Samata party under the leadership of Brahmanand Mandal.

=== Samata Party after 2004 ===
In the 2009 general elections for the 14th Lok Sabha (2009-2014), it had contested in 11 seats and was defeated in all of them. It had secured a total of 31324 votes which was only 0.02 percent of the total number of votes cast in that state.

For the Lok Sabha elections of 2014, the Samata Party decided to forgo any alliance, stating that it would not ally with the Congress. Due to the departure of all the bigwigs from the Samata Party to Janata Dal (United), the party started shrinking gradually. Due to its poor election performance, it began to lose popularity and was almost on the verge of closure. In 2020, the leadership of the party was given to Uday Mandal, he started restructuring it.

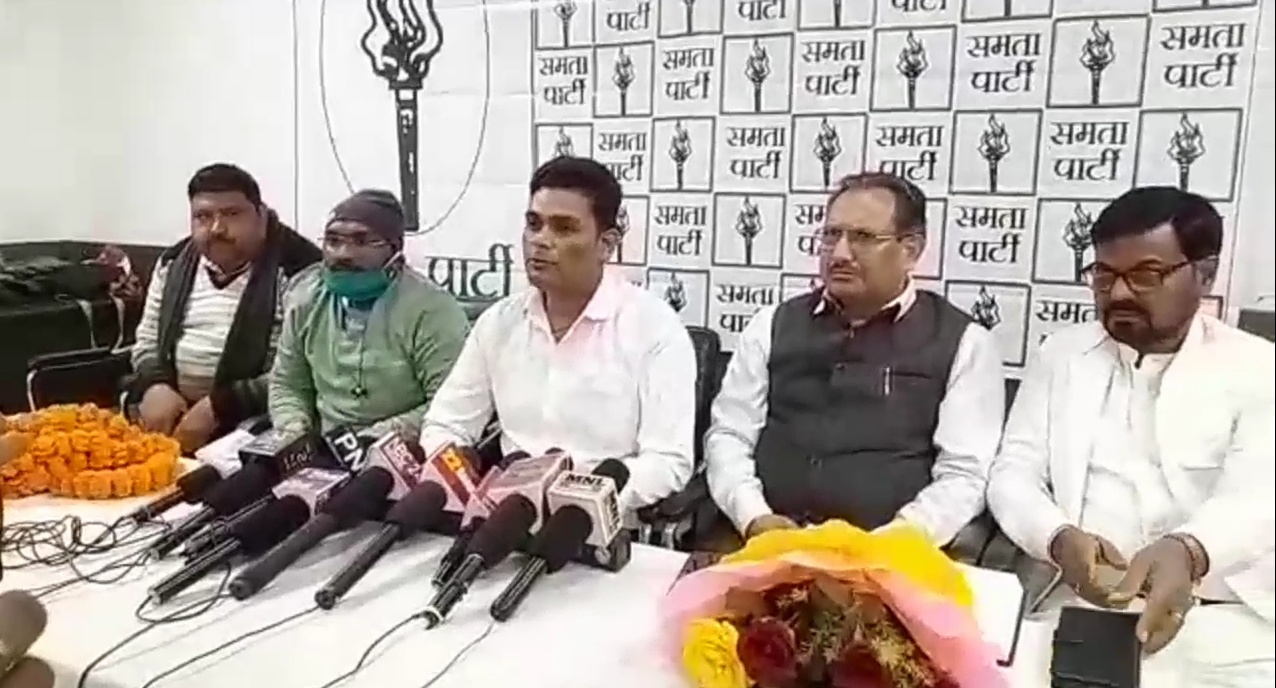
Samata Party Press Conference at Patna

=== Fernandes return in Samata Party in 2007 ===
In 2007, George Fernandes left JD(U) and joined Samata Party along with their supporters, JD(U) general secretary and spokesman Shiv Kumar and senior leader Aneel Hegde, several other leaders and workers from various states left the JD(U) to join the Samata Party on the occasion. These included the Gujarat party unit president Praveensinh Jadeja, Andhra Pradesh unit chief Narasimha Reddy, Uttarakhand party chief Anurag Kumar and suspended party MLA from Bihar Chhedi Paswan. Also present on the occasion was former MP Brahmanand Mandal, the current president of Samata Party who had refused to join the JD(U) at the time of merger.

== Ideology ==
The party follows a socialist ideology; in particular, that of Ram Manohar Lohia.

== Electoral performances ==
=== Lok Sabha (Lower House) ===
Lok Sabha Term	Indian General Election	Seats contested	Seats won	No. of votes	%.of votes in seats contested
11th Lok Sabha	1996	81	8	7,256,086	2.2%
12th Lok Sabha	1998	57	12	6,491,639	1.8%
14th Lok Sabha	2004	40	0	201,276	0.1%
15th Lok Sabha	2009	11	0		0.0%
16th Lok Sabha	2014	10	0		0.0%
18th Lok Sabha	2024	22	0	73,318	0.01%

=== Vidhan Sabha (Lower House) ===
Vidhan Sabha Term	State	elections	Seats contested	Seats won	% of votes	Party Votes
11th Assembly	Bihar	1995	310	7	24,40,275	7.1%
12th Assembly	Bihar	2000	120	34	32,05,746	8.7%
7th Assembly	Manipur	1995	23	2	70,887	6.2%
8th Assembly	Manipur	2000	36	1	84,215	6.7%
9th Assembly	Manipur	2005	31	3	1,09,912	8.3%
	Nagaland	2003	4	1	10,456	1.2%
	Jharkhand	2019	1	0		0.1
	Bihar	2020	10	0		0.1
	Tamil Nadu	2021	1	0		0.1
	Haryana	2024	3	0		0.1
	Jharkhand	2024	4	0		0.1
	Maharashtra	2020	9	0		0.1
	Delhi	2025	2	0		0.1

== List of chief ministers ==
No	Name Constituency	Term of office		Tenure length	Party	State	Assembly
1	Nitish Kumar	3 March 2000	10 March 2000	7 days	Samata Party	Bihar	12th Assembly
2	Radhabinod Koijam	15 February 2001	1 June 2001	106 days	Samata Party	Manipur	8th Assembly

== Symbol crisis ==
The Election Commission of India allotted the "Flaming Torch" symbol to Shiv Sena (Uddhav Balasaheb Thackeray), the Samata Party raise objection against it. A petition filed in Delhi High Court, Samata Party through Uday Kr. Mandal its President Vs Election Commission of India. A single bench of Justice Sanjeev Narula dismissed the case, Samata party appeal in double bench of Judges. Chief Justice Satish Chandra Sharma and Justice Subramontium Prasad again dismissed that appeal. In Uttar Pradesh Local Body Election 2022, Samata Party got their symbol, now the Shiv Sena (UBT) and Samata Party both have the Flaming Torch or Mashal as state Party Symbol.

== See also ==
- List of political parties in India
