= Gangmumei Kamei =

Indian historian, scholar, and politician

Gangmumei Kamei (21 October 1939 – 5 January 2017) was a notable Indian historian and scholar of Manipur. He was also a politician in his later career, and served as a minister in the Government of Manipur.

== Academic career ==
Kamei was born in Imphal, and taught history at Manipur University. He was regarded as an expert on the history of Manipur.

Books:

- Anal, A Trans-Border Tribe of Manipur (1985)
- A History of Manipur: Pre-colonial Period (1991)
- Ethnicity and Social Change: An Anthology of Essays (2002)
- History of Zeliangrong Nagas: From Makhel to Rani Gaidinliu (2004)
- Essays on Primordial Religion (2006)
- On History and Historiography of Manipur (2006)
- From Tribalism to Feudalism: Evolution of the Meitei State in the Pre-colonial Period (2010)
- Lectures on History of Manipur (2012)
- The Rise of Middle Classes in Manipur (2012)
- A History of Modern Manipur 1826-2000 (2015)

Role:

- Professor of History in Manipur University
- Elected president of the Northeast India History Association (NEIHA) in its Kohima session of 1986
- President of the Manipur History Society
- Coordinator of the Centre for Manipuri Studies & Tribal Research of Manipur University
- Member of the Advisory Committee of the Anthropological Survey of India (1984–87)
- Member of the ICSSR panel on Tribal Studies
- In 2010 he was awarded the Platinum Jubilee Samman by the Manipuri Sahitya Parishad for his contribution to history and tribal culture
- Awarded a National Fellowship by Indian Institute of Advanced Study, Shimla in 2010-2012

== Political career ==
Gangmumei Kamei was the founding president of the Federal Party of Manipur which was formed in the year 1993. He was elected as a Member of the Legislative Assembly in the year 1995 and again in 2001 Manipur Assembly. He was the minister for Forest, Environment and Higher Education and has held important portfolios in the then Manipur Government led by Shri Nipamcha Singh in 1998 and 2001. Kamei joined the Bharatiya Janata Party in 2012 and contested the outer Manipur Lok Sabha Constituency. However, he lost and later led development of party policy. Kamei held membership in the Indian Council of Historical Research (ICHR) and the Regional Planning Body of the North Eastern Council (NEC).

== Death ==
He died on 5 January 2017, aged 77.
