= Rajkumar Dorendra Singh =

5th Chief Minister of Manipur

5th Chief Minister of Manipur

Personal details
- Born: 30 September 1934 (age 91)
- Died: 30 March 2018
- Party: Indian National Congress
- Other political affiliations: Bharatiya Janata Party; Manipur Peoples Party

Rajkumar Dorendra Singh, also known as R. K. Dorendra Singh (30 September 1934 – 30 March 2018) was a senior Indian politician and who thrice served as Chief Minister of Northeast Indian state of Manipur.

He represented a number of political parties, was a member of the Indian National Congress (INC), Bharatiya Janata Party (BJP), and a few other parties earlier. He was the Chief Minister of Manipur (Manipur Peoples Party) from 6 December 1974 to 16 May 1977, again from 14 January 1980 to 27 November 1980, and from 8 April 1992 to 31 December 1993.

He was elected to the Rajya Sabha, the Upper House of the Indian Parliament, from Manipur and served from 20 September 1988 till 12 March 1990.

== See also ==
- List of Rajya Sabha members from Manipur
