= Manipur People's Party =

- Abbreviation: MPP
- Leader: S.Brojen Singh
- Chairperson: S.Brojen Singh
- Secretary: Dr. K. Muktasana, Lc Deben, N. Mangol Singh, Kh. Sharatchandra and Th. Sharjukumar
- Founded: 26 December 1968 (57 years ago)
- Split from: Indian National Congress
- Headquarters: People’s Road, Imphal- 795001, Manipur
- Ideology: Regionalism
- Political position: Centre-right
- ECI status: Registered Unrecognised
- Seats in Rajya Sabha: 0
- Seats in Lok Sabha: 0
- Seats in: 0 / 60

Election symbol
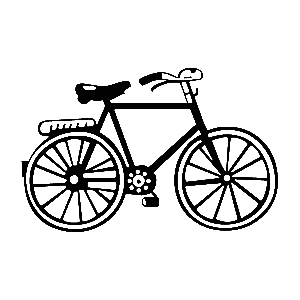

The Manipur People's Party (MPP) is a political party in the Indian state of Manipur. MPP was founded on 26 December 1968 by a group of dissidents from the Indian National Congress. In the 2007 Legislative Assembly election, the party won 5 seats in the Manipur Legislative Assembly.

Currently, it is a part of the North-East Regional Political Front, which supports the BJP-led National Democratic Alliance.

== List of chief ministers ==
| No (Note: A number inside brackets indicates that the incumbent has previously held office.) | Name | Constituency | Term of office | | Days in office |
|---|---|---|---|---|---|
| 3 | Mohammed Alimuddin | Lilong | 23 March 1972 | 27 March 1973 | 1 year, 4 days |
| (3) | Mohammed Alimuddin | Lilong | 4 March 1974 | 9 July 1974 | 127 days |
| 8 | Raj Kumar Ranbir Singh | Keishamthong | 23 February 1990 | 6 January 1992 | 1 year, 317 days |

== See also ==
- Indian National Congress breakaway parties
- O. Joy Singh
- List of political parties in India
