= 2017 Manipur Legislative Assembly election =

2017 assembly elections in Manipur

- 4 – 8 March 2017

All 60 assembly constituencies 31 seats needed for a majority
- Turnout: 86.63%(▲7.44%)
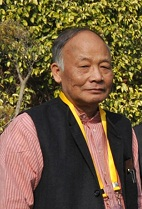

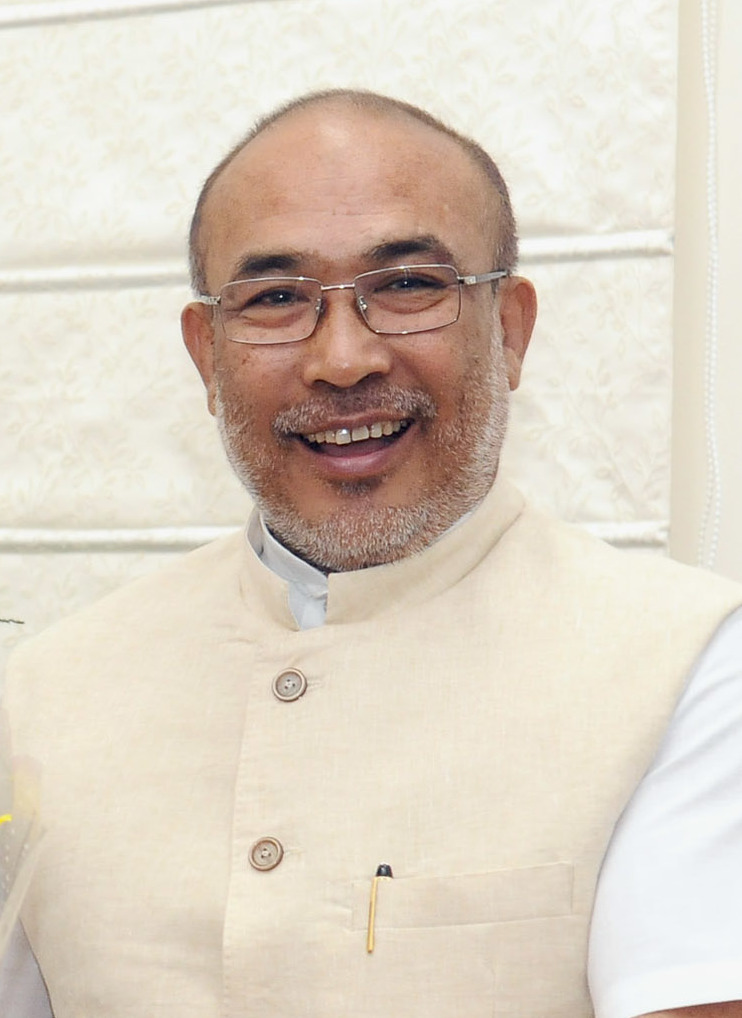

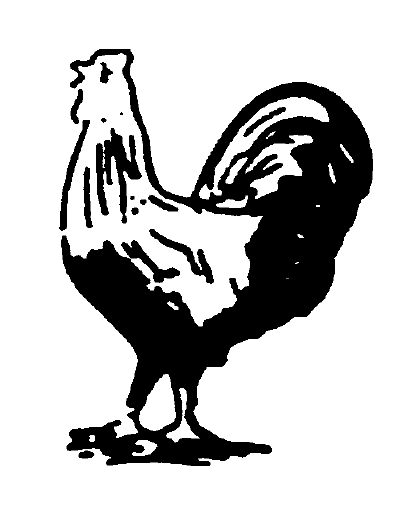

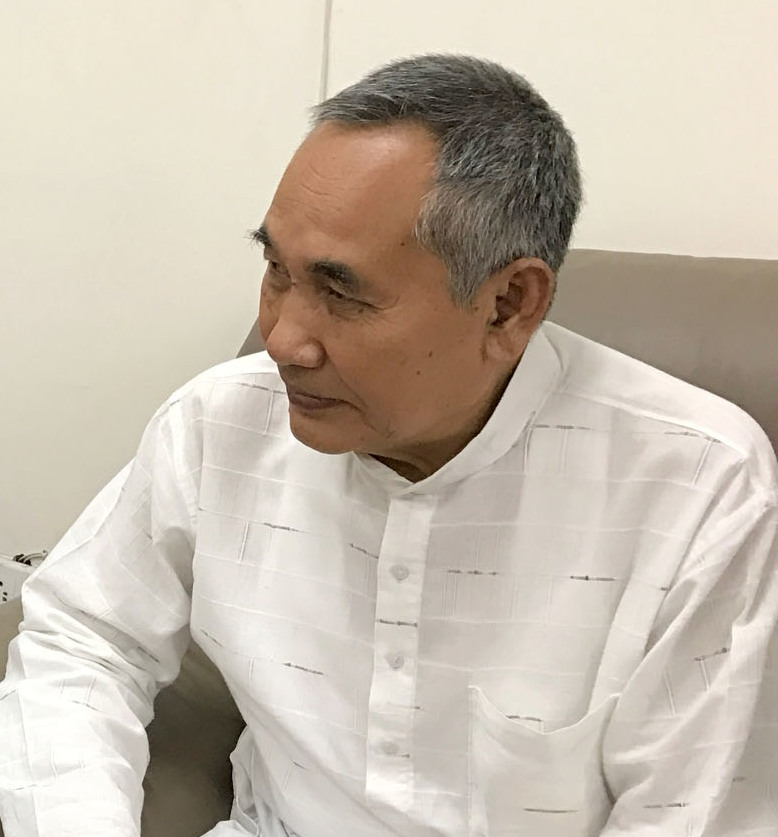

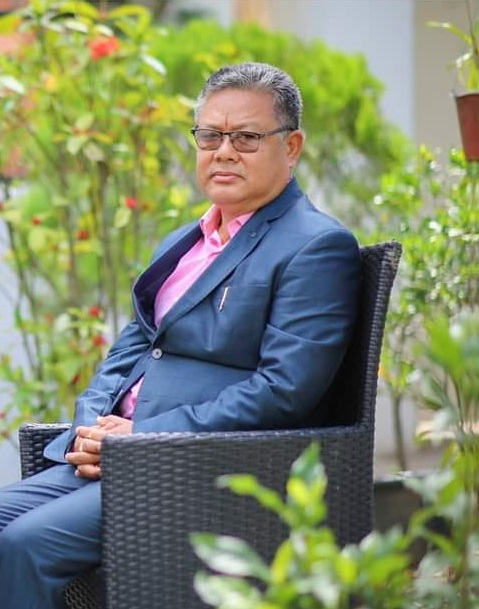

	Majority party	Minority party	Third party
Leader	Okram Ibobi Singh	Nongthombam Biren Singh
Party	INC	BJP	NPF
Alliance	UPA	NDA	NDA
Leader's seat	Thoubal (won)	Heingang (won)	-
Seats before	47	0	4
Seats won	28	21	4
Seat change	▼19	▲21	Steady
Percentage	35.1%	36.3%	7.2%
Swing	▼6.9%	▲35%	▼0.3%
	Fourth party	Fifth party	Sixth party
Leader	Yumnam Joykumar Singh	Karam Shyam	Tongbram Robindro Singh
Party	NPP	LJP	AITC
Alliance	NDA	NDA	-
Leader's seat	Uripok	Langthabal	Thanga
Seats won	4	1	1
Seat change	▲4	Steady	▼4
Percentage	5.1%	2.5%	1.4%
Swing	▲3.9%	▲1.9%	▼15.6%

- Structure of the Manipur Legislative Assembly after the election
Chief Minister before election
Okram Ibobi Singh
INC
Elected Chief Minister
N. Biren Singh
BJP

A Legislative Assembly election was held in Manipur on 4 March and 8 March 2017 to elect the 60 members of the Manipur Legislative Assembly. before the expiration of the term of the previous Assembly on 18 March 2017. The election was fought mainly on the issues of "territorial integrity of Manipur" and the Naga peace accord. The incumbent Indian National Congress lost majority. The Bharatiya Janata Party, which won 21 seats, formed the government with the support of allies.

== Background ==
Prior to 2017, Indian National Congress had been in power for 15 years. In the 2012 election, Congress had won 42 seats and re-elected Okram Ibobi Singh as the chief minister. In 2014, the Manipur State Congress Party, with its five Members of Legislative Assembly, merged with Congress, further increasing its tally.

Despite this apparent strength, the Congress government was beset with problems. In 2015, it yielded to pressures from the Inner Line Permit System movement and passed three bills in the Legislative Assembly to regulate migrants. The tribal communities dubbed them as "anti-tribal bills" and protested. Nine tribals were killed in police firing, and eight bodies were still lying in the morgue as the state went to the polls.

In 2016, N. Biren Singh, who had been denied a ministerial berth in the Ibobi Singh government, revolted against Ibobi Singh along with 25 other legislators. The Congress high command tried to mollify him, by changing the state unit president, appointing Singh as the vice-president and party spokesperson. But the dissidents again grew unhappy with the home minister's lackadaisical treatment of the NSCN-IM (Naga militant group). In October 2016, Biren Singh resigned from the party as well as the Legislative Assembly, and joined the BJP. He was appointed as the party spokesperson and co-convenor of the election committee.

In November 2016, the Ibobi Singh government took the decision to create two new districts, Jiribam and Kangpokpi. The latter had been a longstanding demanding of the Kuki-Zo tribals that dominate the region. However, the Nagas were miffed that their ancestral land had been bifurcated, and imposed a blockade along the two highways that lead into the Imphal Valley. This caused a shortage of essential commodities in the Valley and prices shot up.

At the national level, the Bharatiya Janata Party (BJP) was in power along with its National Democratic Alliance (NDA) partners. The BJP had also created North-East Democratic Alliance (NEDA) in the Northeastern states. Its partners included the National People's Party (NPP), Naga People's Front (NPF), Lok Janshakti Party (LJP). and Janata Dal (United).

== Parties contested ==
Party	Flag	Symbol	Leader	Seats contested
Bharatiya Janata Party			N. Biren Singh	60
Indian National Congress			Okram Ibobi Singh	59
National People's Party			Yumnam Joykumar Singh	20
Lok Jan Shakti Party			Ram Vilas Paswan	17
All India Trinamool Congress			Mamata Banerjee	16
Naga People's Front			Neiphiu Rio	15

== Polling ==
Voter-verified paper audit trail (VVPAT) machines were used along with Electronic Voting Machines (EVMs) in four assembly constituencies in Manipur.

== Opinion polls ==
Polling firm/Link	Date	BJP	INC	NPF	AITC	Other
Axis - India Today	Oct 2016	40-45 (48)	7-8 (10)	3-5 (5)	00	00

== Results ==
Results were declared on 11 March 2017.

← Summary of the 4–8 March 2017 Manipur Legislative Assembly election results
Parties and coalitions	Popular vote			Seats	
Parties and coalitions	Votes	%	±pp	Won	+/−
Indian National Congress (INC)	582,056	35.1	▼6.9	28	▼19
Bharatiya Janata Party (BJP)	601,539	36.3	▲34.2	21	▲21
Naga People's Front (NPF)	118,850	7.2	▼0.3	4	Steady
National People's Party (NPP)	83,744	5.1	▲3.9	4	▲4
Independents	83,834	5.1	▲1.8	1	▲1
Lok Janshakti Party (LJP)	42,263	2.5	▲1.9	1	Steady
All India Trinamool Congress (AITC)	23,384	1.4	▼15.6	1	▼4
None of the Above (NOTA)	9,062	0.6	▲0.6	—N/a	
Total	1,657,975	100.00		60	±0
Valid votes	1,657,975	99.96			
Invalid votes	691	0.04			
Votes cast / turnout	1,658,666	86.63			
Abstentions	255,881	13.37			
Registered voters	1,914,547				

== Results by constituency ==
No.	Constituency	Incumbent		Winner			Runner-up			Margin
No.	Constituency	Party	Candidate	Party	Candidate	Votes	Party	Candidate	Votes	Margin
1	Khundrakpam	INC	Thokchom Lokeshwar Singh	INC	Thokchom Lokeshwar Singh	12,849	BJP	Thangjam Mohendro Singh	9,790	3,059
2	Heingang	INC	Nongthombam Biren Singh	BJP	Nongthombam Biren Singh	10,439	AITC	Pangeijam Saratchandra Singh	9,233	1,206
3	Khurai	INC	Dr. Ng. Bijoy Singh	BJP	Leishangthem Susindro Meitei	15,005	INC	Dr. Ng. Bijoy Singh	13,061	1,944
4	Kshetrigao	INC	Md. Amin Shah	BJP	Nahakpam Indrajit Singh	10,411	INC	Muhammad Amin Shah	10,031	380
5	Thongju	AITC	Thongam Biswajit Singh	BJP	Thongam Biswajit Singh	16,809	INC	Thokchom Ajit Singh	9,508	7,301
6	Keirao	MSCP	Karam Thamarjit Singh	BJP	Lourembam Rameshwor Meetei	5,959	Independent	Muhammad Nasiruddin Khan	5,421	538
7	Andro	AITC	Thounaojam Shyamkumar	INC	Thounaojam Shyamkumar	18,948	BJP	Dr. Nimaichand Luwang	10,787	7,986
8	Lamlai	INC	Kshetrimayum Biren Singh	INC	Kshetrimayum Biren Singh	12,339	BJP	Khongbantabam Ibomcha	11,487	852
9	Thangmeiband	AITC	Khumukcham Joykisan Singh	INC	Khumukcham Joykisan Singh	11,596	BJP	Jyotin Waikhom	11,439	157
10	Uripok	INC	Laishram Nandakumar Singh	NPP	Yumnam Joykumar Singh	6,469	INC	Laishram Nandakumar Singh	6,124	345
11	Sagolband	MSCP	Rajkumar Imo Singh	INC	Rajkumar Imo Singh	9,211	BJP	Dr. Khwairakpam Loken Singh	9,192	19
12	Keishamthong	NCP	Laisom Ibomcha Singh	NPP	L. Jayantakumar	10,000	INC	Laisom Ibomcha Singh	6,739	3,261
13	Singjamei	INC	Irengbam Hemochandra Singh	BJP	Yumnam Khemchand Singh	9,459	INC	Irengbam Hemochandra Singh	7,625	1,834
14	Yaiskul	INC	Elangbam Chand Singh	BJP	Thokchom Satyabrata Singh	8,014	INC	Elangbam Chand Singh	7,444	570
15	Wangkhei	INC	Yumkham Erabot Singh	INC	Okram Henry Singh	16,753	BJP	Yumkham Erabot Singh	12,417	4,336
16	Sekmai (SC)	INC	Khwairakpam Devendro Singh	BJP	Heikham Dingo Singh	13,163	INC	Khwairakpam Devendro Singh	10,631	2,532
17	Lamsang	INC	Wangkheimayum Brajabidhu Singh	BJP	Sorokhaibam Rajen	12,593	INC	Wangkheimayum Brajabidhu Singh	11,313	1,280
18	Konthoujam	AITC	Konthoujam Sharat Singh	BJP	Dr. Sapam Ranjan Singh	14,313	INC	Konthoujam Sharat Singh	11,541	2,772
19	Patsoi	INC	Akoijam Mirabai Devi	INC	Akoijam Mirabai Devi	13,405	NEIDP	Sapam Kunjakeswor Singh	13,291	114
20	Langthabal	LJP	Karam Shyam	LJP	Karam Shyam	9,625	BJP	O. Joy Singh	7,294	2,331
21	Naoriya Pakhanglakpa	INC	R.K. Anand	BJP	Soibam Subhaschandra Singh	8,609	INC	R.K. Anand	6,994	1,615
22	Wangoi	AITC	Oinam Lukhoi Singh	INC	Oinam Lukhoi Singh	7,443	NPP	Khuraijam Loken Singh	7,407	36
23	Mayang Imphal	INC	Dr. Khumujam Ratankumar Singh	BJP	Kongkham Robindro Singh	15,221	INC	Dr. Khumujam Ratankumar Singh	12,127	3,094
24	Nambol	INC	Nameirakpam Loken Singh	INC	Nameirakpam Loken Singh	14,736	BJP	Thounaojam Chaoba Singh	14,456	280
25	Oinam	AITC	Dr. Irengbam Ibohalbi	BJP	Laishram Radhakishore Singh	12,029	INC	Dr. Irengbam Ibohalbi Singh	11,186	843
26	Bishnupur	INC	Konthoujam Govindas	INC	Konthoujam Govindas	14,150	BJP	Konthoujam Krishna Kumar Singh	8,872	5,278
27	Moirang	INC	Mairembam Prithviraj Singh	BJP	Pukhrem Sharatchandra Sing	11,708	INC	Mairembam Prithviraj Singh	11,333	375
28	Thanga	INC	Tongbram Mangibabu	AITC	Tongbram Robindro Singh	6,462	BJP	Moirangthem Asnikumar Singh	5,457	1,005
29	Kumbi	INC	Sanasam Bira Singh	INC	Sanasam Bira Singh	11,881	BJP	Ningthoujam Mangi	10,570	1,311
30	Lilong	INC	Muhammad Abdul Nasir	INC	Muhammad Abdul Nasir	10,765	Independent	Y. Antas Khan	9,497	1,268
31	Thoubal	INC	Okram Ibobi Singh	INC	Okram Ibobi Singh	18,649	BJP	Leitanthem Basanta Singh	8,179	10,470
32	Wangkhem	INC	Keisham Meghachandra Singh	INC	Keisham Meghachandra Singh	11,293	NEIDP	Yumnam Nabachandra Singh	8,413	2,880
33	Heirok	INC	Moirangthem Okendro	BJP	Thokchom Radheshyam Singh	13,389	INC	Moirangthem Okendro	11,742	1,647
34	Wangjing Tentha	INC	Paonam Brojen	INC	Paonam Brojen	12,830	BJP	Moirangthem Hemanta	10,967	1,863
35	Khangabok	INC	Okram Landhoni Dev	INC	Surjakumar Okram	20,781	BJP	Thokchom Jadumani Singh	11,329	9,452
36	Wabgai	INC	Muhammad Fajur Rahim	INC	Muhammad Fajur Rahim	12,474	BJP	Dr. Usham Deben Singh	7,713	4,761
37	Kakching	INC	Yengkhom Surchandra Singh	INC	Yengkhom Surchandra Singh	11,133	BJP	M. Rameshwar Singh (Ramay)	10,503	630
38	Hiyanglam	AITC	Maibam Kunjo	BJP	Yumnam Radheshyam	13,394	INC	Elangbam Dwijamani Singh	11,669	1,725
39	Sugnu	INC	Kangujam Ranjit Singh	INC	Kangujam Ranjit Singh	13,331	BJP	Yumnam Jiban Singh	10,198	3,133
40	Jiribam	INC	Thoudam Debendra Singh	Independent	Ashab Uddin	8,189	INC	Thoudam Debendra Singh	6,539	1,650
41	Chandel (ST)	NPF	St. Nunghlung Victor	NPP	Letpao Haokip	14,216	Independent	Ts Warngam	12,091	2,125
42	Tengnoupal (ST)	INC	D. Korungthang	INC	D. Korungthang	16,940	BJP	Yangkholet Haokip	12,284	4,656
43	Phungyar (ST)	INC	Victor Keishing	NPF	Leishiyo Keishing	11,900	BJP	Somi Awungshi	7,122	4,778
44	Ukhrul (ST)	INC	Samuel Risom	INC	Alfred Kan-Ngam Arthur	11,510	BJP	Somatai Shaiza	11,214	296
45	Chingai (ST)	INC	MK Preshow Shimray	NPF	Khashim Vashum	16,582	BJP	Sword Vashum	8,932	7,650
46	Saikul (ST)	INC	Yamthong Haokip	INC	Yamthong Haokip	8,677	NCP	Chungkhokai Doungel	5,416	3,261
47	Karong (ST)	INC	Dr. V. Alexander Pao	INC	D. D. Thaisii	14,038	BJP	R. Yuh Jonathan Tao	9,745	4,293
48	Mao (ST)	NPF	Losii Dikho	NPF	Losii Dikho	25,933	BJP	Woba Joram	10,519	15,414
49	Tadubi (ST)	INC	M. Francis Ngajokpa	NPP	N. Kayisii	17,115	BJP	M. Francis Ngajokpa	15,816	1,299
50	Kangpokpi	MSCP	Nemcha Kipgen	BJP	Nemcha Kipgen	13,485	Independent	Kharga Tamang	11,188	2,297
51	Saitu (ST)	INC	Ngamthang Haokip	INC	Ngamthang Haokip	19,467	BJP	Haokholet Kipgen	15,650	3,817
52	Tamei (ST)	INC	Z. Kikhonbou Newmai	NPF	Awangbow Newmai	15,933	BJP	Z. Kikhonbou Newmai	15,186	747
53	Tamenglong (ST)	MSCP	Janghemlung Panmei	BJP	Samuel Jendai Kamei	13,023	NPF	Janghemlung Panmei	11,019	2,004
54	Nungba (ST)	INC	Gaikhangam	INC	Gaikhangam	10,255	BJP	Adim Pamei	5,108	5,147
55	Tipaimukh (ST)	INC	Dr. Chaltonlien Amo	INC	Dr. Chaltonlien Amo	4,997	BJP	Dr. Lallukhum Fimate	4,371	626
56	Thanlon (ST)	INC	Vungzagin Valte	BJP	Vungzagin Valte	9,752	INC	Chinkholal Thangsing	2,583	7,169
57	Henglep (ST)	INC	T. Manga Vaiphei	BJP	T. Thangzalam Haokip	8,438	INC	T. Manga Vaiphei	8,170	268
58	Churachandpur (ST)	INC	Phungzathang Tonsing	BJP	V. Hangkhanlian	10,246	NPP	Phungzathang Tonsing	9,632	614
59	Saikot (ST)	INC	T. N. Haokip	INC	T. N. Haokip	16,354	BJP	Paokholal Haokip	11,253	5,101
60	Singhat (ST)	INC	Ginsuanhau	INC	Ginsuanhau	8,131	BJP	Chinlunthang	6,969	1,162

== Government formation ==
On 15 March 2017, N. Biren Singh was sworn as the Chief Minister, having formed a coalition with National People's Party, Naga People's Front and the Lok Janshakti Party. This marked the first time that the Bharatiya Janata Party has formed a government in Manipur. The Indian National Congress remained the single largest party in the legislature.

== By-elections ==
Date	Constituency	Winner	Party
7 November 2020	Wangoi	Oinam Lukhoi Singh	Bharatiya Janata Party
7 November 2020	Lilong	Y.Antas Khan	Independent
7 November 2020	Wangjing Tentha	Paonam Brojen Singh	Bharatiya Janata Party
7 November 2020	Saitu	Ngamthang Haokip	Bharatiya Janata Party
7 November 2020	Singhat	Ginsuanhau Zou	Bharatiya Janata Party

== Bibliography ==
- Attri, Vibha; Bhattacharya, Himanshu (2019), "Assembly Elections 2017–2018", Studies in Indian Politics, 7 (1): 100–129, doi:10.1177/2321023019838879
- Phanjoubam, Pradip (25 March 2017), "BJP Snatches Victory from Defeat in Manipur", Economic and Political Weekly, 52 (12): 25–26, JSTOR 44166817
