= Third Okram Ibobi Singh ministry =

Third cabinet headed by Okram Ibobi Singh (2012–2017)

- 21st ministry of Manipur
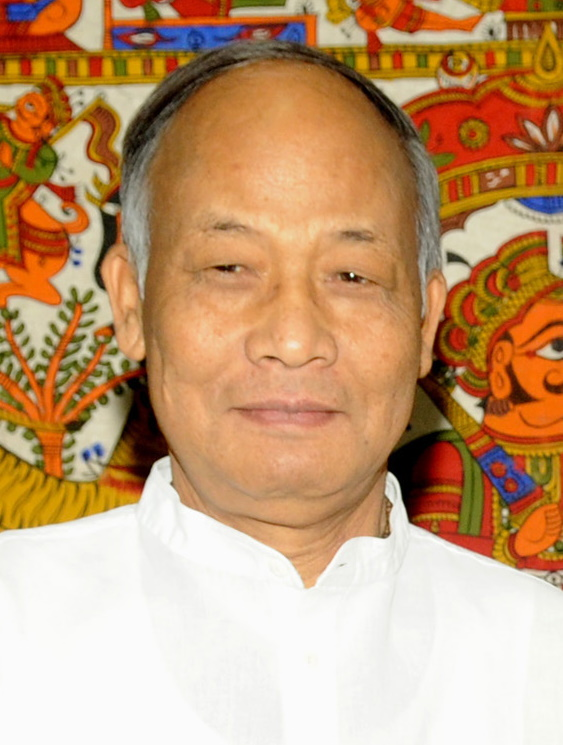
- Okram Ibobi Singh, Chief Minister
- Date formed: 14 March 2012
- Date dissolved: 15 March 2017

People and organisations
- Governor: Gurbachan Jagat (until 2013); Ashwani Kumar (2013); Vinod Kumar Duggal (2013–2014); Krishan Kant Paul (2014–2015); Syed Ahmed (2015); V. Shanmuganathan (2015–2016); Najma Heptulla (from 2016)
- Chief Minister: Okram Ibobi Singh
- Member parties: Indian National Congress
- Status in legislature: Majority

History
- Election: 2012
- Outgoing election: 2017
- Legislature term: 5 years
- Predecessor: Second Ibobi Singh ministry
- Successor: First Biren Singh ministry

The Third Ibobi Singh ministry was the 21st council of ministers of the Indian state of Manipur headed by chief minister Okram Ibobi Singh which was formed on 14 March 2012 following the Indian National Congress' third consecutive victory in the Legislative Assembly election.

== History ==
The ruling Indian National Congress returned to power for the third consecutive term in the state following its decisive victory in the 2012 Legislative Assembly election under the leadership of chief minister Okram Ibobi Singh. The party won 42 out of the 60 seats of the Manipur Legislative Assembly, distantly followed by its nearest rival, the All India Trinamool Congress which won 7 seats, and several other parties winning the remaining of the seats.

On 12 March 2012, chief minister Okram Ibobi Singh tendered his resignation to Governor Gurbachan Jagat and accept the governor's invitation to form the government for the third time.

== Cabinet ==
Okram Ibobi Singh was sworn-in as the chief minister for the third term on 14 March 2012 by Governor Gurbachan Jagat. The ministry was expanded on 17 March 2012 following the induction of three ministers, namely deputy chief minister Gaikhangam Gangmei, Thoudam Debendra Singh, and Phungzathang Tonsing. The ministry was further expanded to its fullest capacity on 28 April 2012 with the induction of eight cabinet ministers namely Irengbam Hemochandra Singh, Govindas Konthoujam, Moirangthem Okendro Singh, Ngamthang Haokip, Francis Ngajokpa, Khumujam Ratankumar Singh, Akoijam Mirabai Devi, and Md. Abdul Nasir.

The ministry was further expanded and reshuffled on 12 April 2016 following the induction of three ministers, namely Kshetrimayum Biren Singh, T. Manga Vaiphei, and D Korungthang. During this reshuffle, three sitting cabinet ministers, namely Thoudam Debendra Singh, Phungzathang Tonsing, and Francis Ngajokpa tendered their resignations.

== List of ministers ==
Cabinet members
Portfolio	Minister	Took office	Left office	Party
Chief Minister and also incharge of: Department of Personnel and Administrative Reforms; Department of Finance; Department of Power; Department of Municipal Administration, Housing and Urban Development; Department of Minor Irrigation; Department of Tourism; All other departments not assigned to any other Minister.	Okram Ibobi Singh	14 March 2012	15 March 2017	INC
Deputy Chief Minister; Minister of Home Affairs; Minister of Horticulture and Soil Conservation; Minister of Tribal Affairs and Hills	Gaikhangam Gangmei	17 March 2012	15 March 2017	INC
Minister of Science and Technology	Okram Ibobi Singh	28 April 2012	13 April 2016	INC
Minister of Science and Technology	T. Manga Vaiphei	13 April 2016	15 March 2017	INC
Minister of Revenue; Minister of Law and Legislative Affairs; Minister of Forest and Environment	Thoudam Debendra Singh	17 March 2012	12 April 2016	INC
Minister of Revenue; Minister of Law and Legislative Affairs; Minister of Forest and Environment	Irengbam Hemochandra Singh	13 April 2016	15 March 2017	INC
Minister of Health and Family Welfare; Minister of General Administration; Minister of Command Area Development Authority	Phungzathang Tonsing	17 March 2012	12 April 2016	INC
Minister of Health and Family Welfare; Minister of General Administration; Minister of Command Area Development Authority	D Korungthang	13 April 2016	15 March 2017	INC
Minister of Public Health Engineering; Minister of Labour and Employment	Irengbam Hemochandra Singh	28 April 2012	13 April 2016	INC
Minister of Public Health Engineering; Minister of Labour and Employment	T. Manga Vaiphei	13 April 2016	15 March 2017	INC
Minister of Commerce and Industry; Minister of Sericulture; Minister of Veterinary and Animal Husbandry	Govindas Konthoujam	28 April 2012	15 March 2017	INC
Minister of Education	Moirangthem Okendro Singh	28 April 2012	13 April 2016	INC
Minister of Education	Khumujam Ratankumar Singh	13 April 2016	15 March 2017	INC
Minister of Consumer Affairs, Food and Public Distribution	Moirangthem Okendro Singh	28 April 2012	13 April 2016	INC
Minister of Consumer Affairs, Food and Public Distribution	Kshetrimayum Biren Singh	13 April 2016	15 March 2017	INC
Minister of Irrigation and Flood Control; Minister of Printing and Stationery	Ngamthang Haokip	28 April 2012	15 March 2017	INC
Minister of Rural Development and Panchayat Raj; Minister of Economics and Statistics	Francis Ngajokpa	28 April 2012	12 April 2016	INC
Minister of Rural Development and Panchayat Raj; Minister of Economics and Statistics	Moirangthem Okendro Singh	13 April 2016	15 March 2017	INC
Minister of Transport	Khumujam Ratankumar Singh	28 April 2012	15 March 2017	INC
Minister of Works	Khumujam Ratankumar Singh	28 April 2012	13 April 2016	INC
Minister of Works	Kshetrimayum Biren Singh	13 April 2016	15 March 2017	INC
Minister of Social Welfare; Minister of Cooperation	Akoijam Mirabai Devi	28 April 2012	15 March 2017	INC
Minister of Agriculture; Minister of Fisheries	Md. Abdul Nasir	28 April 2012	15 March 2017	INC
