= Saikul Assembly constituency =

Legislative Assembly constituency in Manipur State, India

Coordinates: 25.06°N 94.03°E

Saikul
- Constituency No. 46 for the Manipur Legislative Assembly

Constituency details
- Country: India
- Region: Northeast India
- State: Manipur
- District: Kangpokpi
- Lok Sabha constituency: Outer Manipur
- Established: 1972
- Total electors: 29,417
- Reservation: ST

Member of Legislative Assembly
- 12th Manipur Legislative Assembly
- Incumbent Kimneo Haokip Hangshing
- Party: KPA
- Alliance: None
- Elected year: 2022

Saikul is one of the 60 Legislative Assembly constituencies of Manipur state in India.

It is part of Kangpokpi district and is reserved for candidates belonging to the Scheduled Tribes.

== Members of the Legislative Assembly ==
Year	Member	Party
1972	R Voi	Independent politician
1974	Shonkhothang	Indian National Congress
1980	Holkholet Khongsai	Indian National Congress
1984	Holkholet Khongsai	Independent politician
1990	Chungkhokai Doungel	Indian Congress (Socialist) – Sarat Chandra Sinha
1995	Chungkhokai Doungel	Manipur Peoples Party
2000	Chungkhokai Doungel	Nationalist Congress Party
2002	Chungkhokai Doungel	Nationalist Congress Party
2007	Doukhomang Khongsai	Nationalist Congress Party
2012	Yamthong Haokip	Indian National Congress
2017	Yamthong Haokip	Indian National Congress
2022	Kimneo Haokip Hangshing	Kuki People's Alliance

== Election results ==
Vote share of winning candidates
2022	25.38%
2017	29.59%
2012	41.45%
2007	38.80%
2002	35.36%
2000	55.02%
1995	49.42%
1990	39.05%
1984	35.98%
1980	19.17%
1974	28.26%
1972	26.19%

=== 2027 Assembly election ===
2027 Manipur Legislative Assembly election: Saikul
Party	Candidate	Votes	%	±%
INC				
NDA				
NOTA	None of the above			
Majority				
Turnout				
gain from		Swing		

=== Assembly Election 2022 ===
2022 Manipur Legislative Assembly election: Saikul
Party	Candidate	Votes	%	±%
KPA	Kimneo Haokip Hangshing	6,710	25.38%	
Independent	Kenn Raikhan	5,461	20.66%	
Independent	Chungkhokai Doungel	5,107	19.32%	
JD(U)	Ch. Ajang Khongsai	4,486	16.97%	
BJP	Yamthong Haokip	2,667	10.09%	−5.05%
INC	Lhingkim Haokip	935	3.54%	−26.06%
NPP	Seikholal Haokip	645	2.44%	
RPI(A)	Jamchinlen Lunkim	322	1.22%	
Margin of victory		1,249	4.72%	−6.40%
Turnout		26,436	89.87%	9.09%
Registered electors		29,417		−18.96%
KPA gain from INC		Swing	-4.21%	

=== Assembly Election 2017 ===
2017 Manipur Legislative Assembly election: Saikul
Party	Candidate	Votes	%	±%
INC	Yamthong Haokip	8,677	29.59%	−11.86%
NCP	Chungkhokai Doungel	5,416	18.47%	−5.68%
BJP	Paojalet Touthang	4,439	15.14%	
NEIDP	Doukhomang Khongsai	4,008	13.67%	
NPP	Ch. Ajang Khongsai	2,993	10.21%	
LJP	Thangjamang Haokip	2,803	9.56%	
RPI(A)	L. Samuel Kom	464	1.58%	
NPF	Mangvung Thangboi Haokip	304	1.04%	
Margin of victory		3,261	11.12%	4.03%
Turnout		29,322	80.77%	21.86%
Registered electors		36,301		1.89%
INC hold		Swing	-11.86%	

=== Assembly Election 2012 ===
2012 Manipur Legislative Assembly election: Saikul
Party	Candidate	Votes	%	±%
INC	Yamthong Haokip	8,700	41.45%	4.17%
AITC	Chungkhokai Doungel	7,211	34.36%	
NCP	Doukhomang Khongsai	5,069	24.15%	−14.65%
Margin of victory		1,489	7.09%	5.57%
Turnout		20,989	58.88%	−26.11%
Registered electors		35,629		0.77%
INC gain from NCP		Swing	2.65%	

=== Assembly Election 2007 ===
2007 Manipur Legislative Assembly election: Saikul
Party	Candidate	Votes	%	±%
NCP	Doukhomang Khongsai	11,664	38.80%	3.44%
INC	Chungkhokai Doungel	11,206	37.28%	9.90%
Independent	Yamthong Haokip	7,191	23.92%	
Margin of victory		458	1.52%	−6.13%
Turnout		30,061	85.02%	−6.15%
Registered electors		35,358		13.14%
NCP hold		Swing	3.44%	

=== Assembly Election 2002 ===
2002 Manipur Legislative Assembly election: Saikul
Party	Candidate	Votes	%	±%
NCP	Chungkhokai Doungel	9,989	35.36%	−19.66%
SAP	Doukhomang Khongsai	7,827	27.71%	16.53%
INC	Yamthong Haokip	7,733	27.37%	14.77%
FPM	Soineimang Vaiphei	1,869	6.62%	−7.72%
MSCP	Ch. Ajang Khongsai	489	1.73%	1.13%
BJP	Nehkhomang Haokip	291	1.03%	
Margin of victory		2,162	7.65%	−33.04%
Turnout		28,249	91.17%	−1.28%
Registered electors		31,251		4.91%
NCP hold		Swing	-14.06%	

=== Assembly Election 2000 ===
2000 Manipur Legislative Assembly election: Saikul
Party	Candidate	Votes	%	±%
NCP	Chungkhokai Doungel	14,746	55.02%	
FPM	Johnson Keishing	3,841	14.33%	
INC	Yamthong Haokip	3,377	12.60%	−21.03%
SAP	Doukhomang Khongsai	2,996	11.18%	
MPP	Demkhokhai	853	3.18%	−46.24%
CPI	Ch. Ajang Khongsai	512	1.91%	
Independent	Nehkhomang Haokip	227	0.85%	
MSCP	Holkholet Khongsai	160	0.60%	
Margin of victory		10,905	40.69%	24.90%
Turnout		26,799	90.84%	−1.60%
Registered electors		29,788		25.18%
NCP gain from MPP		Swing	5.60%	

=== Assembly Election 1995 ===
1995 Manipur Legislative Assembly election: Saikul
Party	Candidate	Votes	%	±%
MPP	Chungkhokai Doungel	10,730	49.42%	46.24%
INC	Holkholet Khongsai	7,302	33.63%	10.58%
IC(S)	Thangjamang Haokip	2,422	11.16%	
Independent	John L. Kilong	1,148	5.29%	
Margin of victory		3,428	15.79%	−0.21%
Turnout		21,710	92.44%	1.40%
Registered electors		23,796		−1.70%
MPP gain from INS(SCS)		Swing	10.37%	

=== Assembly Election 1990 ===
1990 Manipur Legislative Assembly election: Saikul
Party	Candidate	Votes	%	±%
INS(SCS)	Chungkhokai Doungel	8,508	39.05%	
INC	Holkholet Khongsai	5,023	23.06%	4.18%
BJP	Paojakhup	2,856	13.11%	
JD	R. Michael Athing	2,420	11.11%	
Manipur Hill People'S Council	Ramthing Hungyo	1,778	8.16%	
MPP	John L. Kilong	693	3.18%	−8.86%
KNA	K. L. Kom	509	2.34%	
Margin of victory		3,485	16.00%	−1.11%
Turnout		21,787	91.04%	−2.99%
Registered electors		24,207		23.15%
INS(SCS) gain from Independent		Swing	3.07%	

=== Assembly Election 1984 ===
1984 Manipur Legislative Assembly election: Saikul
Party	Candidate	Votes	%	±%
Independent	Holkholet Khongsai	6,515	35.98%	
INC	Ramthing Hungyo	3,418	18.88%	
Independent	John L. Kilong	2,546	14.06%	
Independent	R. Michael Athing	2,217	12.24%	
MPP	Haopao Touthang	2,181	12.05%	5.99%
Independent	Letkhosei	699	3.86%	
Independent	Shonkhothang Ashon	530	2.93%	
Margin of victory		3,097	17.10%	14.61%
Turnout		18,106	94.04%	17.59%
Registered electors		19,657		12.43%
Independent gain from INC(U)		Swing	16.81%	

=== Assembly Election 1980 ===
1980 Manipur Legislative Assembly election: Saikul
Party	Candidate	Votes	%	±%
INC(U)	Holkholet Khongsai	2,456	19.17%	
KNA	K. S. Seiboy	2,136	16.67%	
Independent	John L. Kilong	1,884	14.71%	
Independent	R. Michael Athing	1,825	14.25%	
Independent	Shonkhothang Ashon	1,706	13.32%	
INC(I)	Haokhopao	1,189	9.28%	
MPP	Khangba Anth	776	6.06%	
JP	K. Envy	713	5.57%	
Independent	Thangjamang Haokip	115	0.90%	
Margin of victory		320	2.50%	−0.42%
Turnout		12,811	76.45%	−9.00%
Registered electors		17,484		15.68%
INC(U) gain from INC		Swing	-9.08%	

=== Assembly Election 1974 ===
1974 Manipur Legislative Assembly election: Saikul
Party	Candidate	Votes	%	±%
INC	Shonkhothang Ashon	3,580	28.26%	11.69%
KNA	Lalkhohen	3,210	25.34%	
Independent	R. S. Changson	2,316	18.28%	
Independent	Thangkhopao	1,750	13.81%	
Manipur Hills Union	Khangba Anth	1,547	12.21%	
Independent	Haokholen	267	2.11%	
Margin of victory		370	2.92%	−6.48%
Turnout		12,670	85.45%	20.15%
Registered electors		15,114		21.25%
INC gain from Independent		Swing	2.07%	

=== Assembly Election 1972 ===
1972 Manipur Legislative Assembly election: Saikul
Party	Candidate	Votes	%	±%
Independent	R Voi	2,053	26.19%	
Independent	Thangkhopao	1,316	16.79%	
INC	Shonkhothang Ashon	1,299	16.57%	
MPP	Khangba Anth	1,085	13.84%	
Independent	Holkholet Khongsai	885	11.29%	
Independent	Nehkhomang Haokip	817	10.42%	
Independent	Holkhosei Chongthu	322	4.11%	
Independent	Thangjamang Haokip	63	0.80%	
Margin of victory		737	9.40%	
Turnout		7,840	65.30%	
Registered electors		12,465		
Independent win (new seat)				

== See also ==
- List of constituencies of the Manipur Legislative Assembly
- Senapati district
