= L. M. Khaute =

Indian politician

Member of the Manipur Legislative Assembly

Lallian Mang Khaute (1962) is an Indian politician from Manipur. He is an MLA from Churachandpur Assembly constituency, which is reserved for Scheduled Tribes, in Churachandpur District. He won the 2022 Manipur Legislative Assembly election, representing the Janata Dal (United).

== Early life and education ==
Khaute resides at old Lambulane, Jail Road, Imphal, Imphal West District, Manipur, and at Thangzam Road, Churachandpur, Manipur. He is the son of late SuangKhopau Khaute. He married Mimi Vaphei, a research officer in the Planning department of the Manipur government, and they have two children, Paulalvang Khaute and Khuplalrem Khaute. He is a former DGP of Government of Manipur. He completed his post-graduation in International Studies, an M.A. in politics, in 1983, at the Jawaharlal Nehru University, New Delhi.

== Career ==
Khaute won from Churachandpur Assembly constituency representing the Janata Dal (United) in the 2022 Manipur Legislative Assembly election. He polled 19,231 votes and defeated his nearest rival, V. Hangkhanlian of the Bharatiya Janata Party, by 624 votes.
