= Kimneo Haokip Hangshing =

Indian politician

Member of the Manipur Legislative Assembly
- Incumbent
- Assumed office 2022
- Preceded by: Yamthong Haokip
- Constituency: Saikul

Personal details
- Party: Kuki People's Alliance

Kimneo Haokip Hangshing is an Indian politician and a member of Manipur Legislative Assembly from Saikul representing Kuki People's Alliance since March 2022.

== Personal life ==
Kimneo Haokip Hangshing is the daughter of Ngamthang Haokip, former BJP MLA and Minister from Saitu. She is married to David Hangshing, chairman of the militant group Kuki Revolutionary Army that has been under Suspension of Operations agreement with the Government of India since 2008. Her political party, Kuki People's Alliance, is allegedly associated with Kuki National Organisation.
