= Wangjing Tentha Assembly constituency =

Legislative Assembly constituency in Manipur State, India

Coordinates: 24.56°N 94.03°E

Wangjing Tentha
- Constituency No. 34 for the Manipur Legislative Assembly

Constituency details
- Country: India
- Region: Northeast India
- State: Manipur
- District: Thoubal
- Lok Sabha constituency: Outer Manipur
- Established: 1972
- Total electors: 33,398
- Reservation: None

Member of Legislative Assembly
- 12th Manipur Legislative Assembly
- Incumbent Paonam Brojen
- Party: Bharatiya Janata Party

Wangjing Tentha is one of the 60 Legislative Assembly constituencies of Manipur state in India.

It is part of Thoubal district. As of 2022, its representative is Paonam Brojen of the Bharatiya Janata Party.

== Extent ==
Wangjing tentha is the 34th among 60 assembly constituencies of Manipur. It consists of 39 parts namely:- 1 - Tentha Khunjao Makha Leikai, 2 - Tentha Makha Leikai, 3 - Tentha Khongbal (A), 4 - Tentha Khongbal (B), 5 - Tentha Heibung, ...39 - Phundrei (A).

== Members of the Legislative Assembly ==
Year	Member	Party
1972	Naorem Kunjobapu	Manipur Peoples Party
1974	Saqam Ibomcha Singh	Independent politician
1980	Laishram Saratchandra Singh	Independent politician
1984	Moirangthem Nara Singh	Communist Party of India
1990	Moirangthem Nara Singh	Communist Party of India
1995	Moirangthem Hemanta Singh	Indian National Congress
2000	Moirangthem Hemanta Singh	Manipur State Congress Party
2002	Moirangthem Nara Singh	Communist Party of India
2007	Moirangthem Hemanta Singh	Indian National Congress
2012	Paonam Brojen	Manipur State Congress Party
2017	Paonam Brojen	Indian National Congress
2020 by-election	Paonam Brojen	Bharatiya Janata Party
2022	Paonam Brojen	Bharatiya Janata Party

== Election results ==
Vote share of winning candidates
2022	51.69%
2020 by-election	52.01%
2017	43.37%
2012	45.50%
2007	44.86%
2002	43.16%
2000	34.69%
1995	41.52%
1990	31.07%
1984	19.59%
1980	25.02%
1974	21.53%
1972	31.91%

=== 2027 Assembly election ===
2027 Manipur Legislative Assembly election: Wangjing Tentha
Party	Candidate	Votes	%	±%
INC				
NDA				
NOTA	None of the above			
Majority				
Turnout				
gain from		Swing		

=== Assembly Election 2022 ===
2022 Manipur Legislative Assembly election: Wangjing Tentha
Party	Candidate	Votes	%	±%
BJP	Paonam Brojen	15,765	51.69%	▼0.31
INC	Moirangthem Hemanta Singh	13,852	45.42%	▼1.45
NPP	Usham Manglem	723	2.37%	New
NOTA	None of the Above	158	0.52%	▼0.02
Margin of victory		1,913	6.27%	▲1.14
Turnout		30,498	91.32%	▼0.98
Registered electors		33,398		▲4.63
BJP hold		Swing	▼0.31	

=== Assembly By-election 2020 ===
2020 Manipur Legislative Assembly by-election: Wangjing Tentha
Party	Candidate	Votes	%	±%
BJP	Paonam Brojen	15,321	52.01%	▲14.94
INC	Moirangthem Hemanta Singh	13,808	46.87%	▲3.50
Independent	Sarangthem Manaobi	331	1.12%	New
NOTA	None of the Above	159	0.54%	New
Margin of victory		1,513	5.14%	▼1.16
Turnout		29,460	92.84%	▲0.12
Registered electors		31,919		▼0.55
BJP gain from INC		Swing	▲8.64	

=== Assembly Election 2017 ===
2017 Manipur Legislative Assembly election: Wangjing Tentha
Party	Candidate	Votes	%	±%
INC	Paonam Brojen	12,830	43.37%	▲11.86
BJP	Moirangthem Hemanta	10,967	37.07%	New
CPI	Haobam Robindro Singh	5,562	18.80%	▼3.38
NOTA	None of the Above	105	0.35%	New
Margin of victory		1,863	6.30%	▼7.69
Turnout		29,585	92.17%	▼0.04
Registered electors		32,097		▲10.32
INC gain from MSCP		Swing	▼2.13	

=== Assembly Election 2012 ===
2012 Manipur Legislative Assembly election: Wangjing Tentha
Party	Candidate	Votes	%	±%
MSCP	Paonam Brojen	12,207	45.50%	New
INC	Moirangthem Hemanta Singh	8,454	31.51%	▼13.35
CPI	Moirangthem Nara Singh	5,950	22.18%	▼20.11
AITC	Sagolsem Ibochoubi Singh	218	0.81%	New
Margin of victory		3,753	13.99%	▲11.41
Turnout		26,829	92.21%	▲1.46
Registered electors		29,094		▲7.61
MSCP gain from INC		Swing	▲0.64	

=== Assembly Election 2007 ===
2007 Manipur Legislative Assembly election: Wangjing Tentha
Party	Candidate	Votes	%	±%
INC	Moirangthem Hemanta Singh	11,007	44.86%	▲28.57
CPI	Moirangthem Nara Singh	10,375	42.28%	▼0.88
RJD	Sagolsem Ibochoubi Singh	1,944	7.92%	New
MPP	Laishram Krishna Singh	1,211	4.94%	New
Margin of victory		632	2.58%	▼4.56
Turnout		24,537	90.76%	▼0.77
Registered electors		27,036		▲15.48
INC gain from CPI		Swing	▲1.70	

=== Assembly Election 2002 ===
2002 Manipur Legislative Assembly election: Wangjing Tentha
Party	Candidate	Votes	%	±%
CPI	Moirangthem Nara Singh	9,249	43.16%	▲11.26
MSCP	Moirangthem Hemanta Singh	7,720	36.03%	▲1.34
INC	Sapam Suresh Singh	3,491	16.29%	▲6.69
SAP	Sagolsem Ibochoubi Singh	534	2.49%	New
BJP	Sorokhaibam Gitchandra Singh	120	0.56%	▼14.70
Margin of victory		1,529	7.14%	▲4.35
Turnout		21,429	91.53%	▼1.08
Registered electors		23,412		▲3.20
CPI gain from MSCP		Swing	▲8.47	

=== Assembly Election 2000 ===
2000 Manipur Legislative Assembly election: Wangjing Tentha
Party	Candidate	Votes	%	±%
MSCP	Moirangthem Hemanta Singh	7,288	34.69%	New
CPI	Moirangthem Nara Singh	6,703	31.91%	▼0.30
BJP	Sapam Suresh Singh	3,205	15.26%	New
INC	Sagolsem Ibochoubi Singh	2,017	9.60%	▼31.91
FPM	Khundrakpam Maniton	1,514	7.21%	New
Margin of victory		585	2.78%	▼6.53
Turnout		21,009	92.61%	▼0.90
Registered electors		22,686		▲15.30
MSCP gain from INC		Swing	▼6.83	

=== Assembly Election 1995 ===
1995 Manipur Legislative Assembly election: Wangjing Tentha
Party	Candidate	Votes	%	±%
INC	Moirangthem Hemanta Singh	7,638	41.52%	▲13.86
CPI	Moirangthem Nara Singh	5,925	32.20%	▲1.13
SAP	Sagolsem Ibochoubi Singh	4,450	24.19%	New
MPP	Maibam Rajen Singh	166	0.90%	▼18.02
Margin of victory		1,713	9.31%	▲5.89
Turnout		18,398	93.50%	▲3.33
Registered electors		19,676		▼9.29
INC gain from CPI		Swing	▲10.44	

=== Assembly Election 1990 ===
1990 Manipur Legislative Assembly election: Wangjing Tentha
Party	Candidate	Votes	%	±%
CPI	Moirangthem Nara Singh	6,078	31.07%	▲11.49
INC	Moirangthem Hemanta	5,409	27.65%	▲16.74
Independent	Sagolsem Ibochoubi Singh	3,774	19.29%	New
MPP	Sapam Ibocha Singh	3,701	18.92%	▲5.15
Independent	Maibam Rajen Singh	277	1.42%	New
Margin of victory		669	3.42%	▲0.37
Turnout		19,561	90.18%	▲0.71
Registered electors		21,692		▲23.46
CPI hold		Swing	▲11.49	

=== Assembly Election 1984 ===
1984 Manipur Legislative Assembly election: Wangjing Tentha
Party	Candidate	Votes	%	±%
CPI	Moirangthem Nara Singh	3,079	19.59%	▲0.69
Independent	Sapam Ibocha Singh	2,599	16.53%	New
MPP	Sagolsem Ibochoubi Singh	2,164	13.77%	▲8.11
Independent	Moirangthem Hemanta	1,893	12.04%	New
INC	Kh. Leimu	1,716	10.92%	New
Independent	Laishram Saratchandra Singh	1,700	10.81%	New
Independent	Tekcham Angojao	1,488	9.47%	New
Independent	Paonam Birahari	502	3.19%	New
Independent	Maibam Rajen Singh	205	1.30%	New
Margin of victory		480	3.05%	▼3.08
Turnout		15,720	89.47%	▲2.55
Registered electors		17,570		▲18.64
CPI gain from Independent		Swing	▼5.44	

=== Assembly Election 1980 ===
1980 Manipur Legislative Assembly election: Wangjing Tentha
Party	Candidate	Votes	%	±%
Independent	Laishram Saratchandra Singh	3,221	25.02%	New
CPI	Moirangthem Nara Singh	2,432	18.89%	▲7.77
INC(I)	Sapam Ibocha Singh	2,411	18.73%	New
Independent	Tekcham Angojao	1,373	10.67%	New
JP	Laishram Khombon Singh	1,168	9.07%	New
INC(U)	Khundrakpam Leimbu	1,113	8.65%	New
MPP	Moirangthem Brajamani	728	5.66%	▼12.41
Margin of victory		789	6.13%	▲2.67
Turnout		12,872	86.92%	▼3.44
Registered electors		14,809		▲21.96
Independent hold		Swing	▲3.50	

=== Assembly Election 1974 ===
1974 Manipur Legislative Assembly election: Wangjing Tentha
Party	Candidate	Votes	%	±%
Independent	Sapam Ibomcha Singh	2,362	21.53%	New
MPP	Naorem Kunjobabu	1,982	18.06%	▼13.85
Independent	Laishram Saratchandra Singh	1,912	17.42%	New
INC(O)	Laishram Khombon Singh	1,531	13.95%	▼12.02
Independent	Khundrakpam Lelmu	1,389	12.66%	New
CPI	Moirangthem Nara Singh	1,221	11.13%	New
Socialist Party (India)	Moirangthem Tompok Singh	141	1.28%	▼8.29
Margin of victory		380	3.46%	▼2.48
Turnout		10,973	90.36%	▲4.62
Registered electors		12,143		▲24.02
Independent gain from MPP		Swing	▼10.39	

=== Assembly Election 1972 ===
1972 Manipur Legislative Assembly election: Wangjing Tentha
Party	Candidate	Votes	%	±%
MPP	Naorem Kunjobapu	2,679	31.91%	New
INC(O)	Laisram Khomdon	2,180	25.97%	New
INC	Sapam Chaoba	1,484	17.68%	New
Independent	Thokchom Sajou	1,053	12.54%	New
Socialist Party (India)	Langpoklakpam Samu	804	9.58%	New
Margin of victory		499	5.94%	
Turnout		8,395	85.74%	
Registered electors		9,791		
MPP win (new seat)				

== See also ==
- List of constituencies of the Manipur Legislative Assembly
- Thoubal district
