= Paonam Brojen Singh =

Indian politician

Paonam Brojen
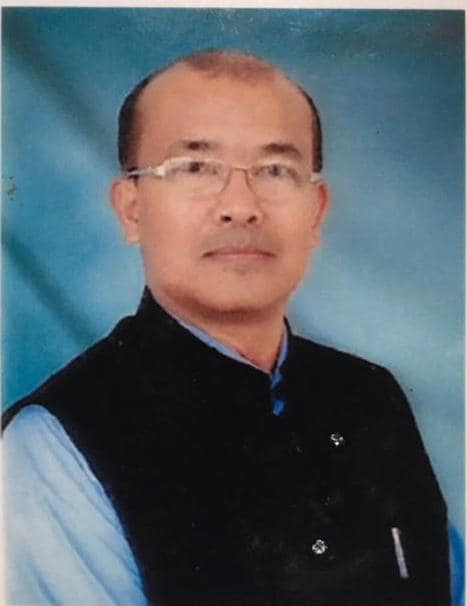
- Paonam Brojen

Member of Manipur Legislative Assembly
- In office 2012–2020
- Preceded by: Moirangthem Hemanta Singh
- Succeeded by: Self
- Constituency: Wangjing Tentha
- Incumbent
- Assumed office 2022

Personal details
- Born: Paonam Brojen
- Party: Bharatiya Janata Party
- Other political affiliations: Indian National Congress
- Profession: Entrepreneur, Social Worker

Paonam Brojen Singh is an Indian politician of Manipur and member of the Bharatiya Janata Party. He was elected as a member of the Manipur Legislative Assembly from Wangjing Tentha constituency in Thoubal District from the Indian National Congress in 2012 & 2017 Manipur Legislative Assembly election.

During the 2020 Manipur vote of confidence, he was one of the eight MLAs who had skipped the assembly proceedings defying the party whip for the trust vote. He resigned from Indian National Congress and later joined Bharatiya Janata Party in presence of Ram Madhav, Baijayant Panda and Chief Minister of Manipur N. Biren Singh.
