= Muhammad Fajur Rahim =

Indian politician

Muhammad Fajur Rahim is an Indian politician and member of the Manipur Legislative Assembly representing Wabgai. He was elected in 2017 as a candidate of the Indian National Congress. He was one of three Muslim candidates elected to the Manipur Legislative Assembly in 2017. In the 2022 Manipur Legislative Assembly election, he narrowly lost the election from Wabgai constituency to BJP's Usham Deben Singh, by 50 votes.
