= Hiyanglam Assembly constituency =

Legislative Assembly constituency in Manipur State, India

Coordinates: 24.52°N 93.92°E

Hiyanglam
- Constituency for the Manipur Legislative Assembly

Constituency details
- Country: India
- Region: Northeast India
- State: Manipur
- District: Thoubal
- Lok Sabha constituency: Outer Manipur
- Established: 1967
- Total electors: 27,926
- Reservation: None

Member of Legislative Assembly
- 12th Manipur Legislative Assembly
- Incumbent Yumnam Radheshyam
- Party: Bharatiya Janata Party
- Elected year: 2022

Hiyanglam Legislative Assembly constituency is one of the 60 Legislative Assembly constituencies of Manipur state in India.

It is part of Thoubal district.

== Members of the Legislative Assembly ==
| Year | Winner | Party |
|---|---|---|
| 1967 | T. Anoubi | Samyukta Socialist Party |
| 1972 | Huidrom Rajbapu Singh | Socialist Party |
| 1974 | Maibam Kunjo | Manipur Peoples Party |
| 1980 | Elangbam Babudhon | Communist Party of India |
| 1984 | Elangbam Biramani Singh | Indian National Congress |
| 1990 | Elangbam Biramani Singh | Indian National Congress |
| 1995 | Maibam Kunjo Singh | Janata Dal |
| 2000 | Maibam Kunjo Singh | Manipur State Congress Party |
| 2002 | Elangbam Biramani Singh | Nationalist Congress Party |
| 2007 | Elangbam Dwijamani Singh | Indian National Congress |
| 2012 | Maibam Kunjo | All India Trinamool Congress |
| 2014 by-election | Elangbam Dwijamani Singh | Indian National Congress |
| 2017 | Dr. Yumnam Radheshyam | Bharatiya Janata Party |
| 2022 | Dr. Yumnam Radheshyam | Bharatiya Janata Party |

== Election results ==
Vote share of winning candidates
| 2022 | 33.05% |
| 2017 | 53.17% |
| 2014 by-election | 38.83% |
| 2012 | 31.16% |
| 2007 | 32.58% |
| 2002 | 31.26% |
| 2000 | 29.81% |
| 1995 | 41.44% |
| 1990 | 34.03% |
| 1984 | 28.04% |
| 1980 | 27.77% |
| 1974 | 19.75% |
| 1972 | 23.02% |
| 1967 | 23.08% |

=== 2027 Assembly election ===
2027 Manipur Legislative Assembly election: Hiyanglam
| Party | Candidate | Votes | % | ±% |
|---|---|---|---|---|
| INC | | | | |
| NDA | | | | |
| NOTA | None of the above | | | |
| Majority | | | | |
| Turnout | | | | |
| gain from | | Swing | | |

=== 2022 Assembly election ===
2022 Manipur Legislative Assembly election: Hiyanglam
| Party | Candidate | Votes | % | ±% |
|---|---|---|---|---|
| BJP | Dr. Yumnam Radheshyam | 8,713 | 33.05% | ▼20.12 |
| INC | Dr. Huidrom Jiten Singh | 6,584 | 24.97% | ▼21.35 |
| JD(U) | Elangbam Dwijamani Singh | 6,559 | 24.88% | New |
| NPP | Maibam Dhanabir Singh | 4,223 | 16.02% | New |
| NOTA | None of the Above | 150 | 0.57% | ▲0.06 |
| RPI(A) | Nongmaithem Sanjay Singh | 134 | 0.51% | New |
| Margin of victory | | 2,129 | 8.08% | ▲1.23 |
| Turnout | | 26,363 | 94.40% | ▼0.83 |
| Registered electors | | 27,926 | | ▲5.58 |
| BJP hold | | Swing | ▼20.12 | |

=== 2017 Assembly election ===
2017 Manipur Legislative Assembly election: Hiyanglam
| Party | Candidate | Votes | % | ±% |
|---|---|---|---|---|
| BJP | Dr. Yumnam Radheshyam | 13,394 | 53.17% | ▲25.99 |
| INC | Elangbam Dwijamani Singh | 11,669 | 46.32% | ▲7.50 |
| NOTA | None of the Above | 127 | 0.50% | New |
| Margin of victory | | 1,725 | 6.85% | ▼1.04 |
| Turnout | | 25,190 | 95.24% | ▲0.65 |
| Registered electors | | 26,450 | | ▲7.83 |
| BJP gain from INC | | Swing | ▲14.35 | |

=== 2014 Assembly by-election ===
2014 Manipur Legislative Assembly by-election: Hiyanglam
| Party | Candidate | Votes | % | ±% |
|---|---|---|---|---|
| INC | Elangbam Dwijamani Singh | 9,008 | 38.83% | ▲7.75 |
| AITC | Yumnam Radheshyam Singh | 7,179 | 30.94% | ▼0.22 |
| BJP | Maibam Dhanabir Singh | 6,306 | 27.18% | ▲25.46 |
| MPP | M. Amutombi Singh | 615 | 2.65% | ▼2.64 |
| NOTA | None of the Above | 46 | 0.20% | New |
| Margin of victory | | 1,829 | 7.88% | ▲7.80 |
| Turnout | | 23,201 | 94.77% | ▲2.14 |
| Registered electors | | 24,530 | | ▲7.47 |
| INC gain from AITC | | Swing | ▲7.67 | |

=== 2012 Assembly election ===
2012 Manipur Legislative Assembly election: Hiyanglam
| Party | Candidate | Votes | % | ±% |
|---|---|---|---|---|
| AITC | Maibam Kunjo | 6,574 | 31.16% | New |
| INC | Elangbam Dwijamani Singh | 6,557 | 31.08% | ▼1.50 |
| CPI | Dr. Yumnam Radheshyam | 6,489 | 30.76% | ▲2.52 |
| MPP | Mayengbam Amutombi Singh | 1,116 | 5.29% | ▼3.08 |
| BJP | Ashokumar Laiphrakpam | 363 | 1.72% | New |
| Margin of victory | | 17 | 0.08% | ▼1.68 |
| Turnout | | 21,099 | 92.44% | ▲2.54 |
| Registered electors | | 22,825 | | ▼6.39 |
| AITC gain from INC | | Swing | ▼1.42 | |

=== 2007 Assembly election ===
2007 Manipur Legislative Assembly election: Hiyanglam
| Party | Candidate | Votes | % | ±% |
|---|---|---|---|---|
| INC | Elangbam Dwijamani Singh | 7,141 | 32.58% | ▲12.92 |
| NCP | Maibam Kunjo Singh | 6,756 | 30.82% | ▼0.44 |
| CPI | Elangbam Biramani Singh | 6,189 | 28.23% | New |
| MPP | Ashokumar Laiphrakpam | 1,835 | 8.37% | New |
| Margin of victory | | 385 | 1.76% | ▼4.68 |
| Turnout | | 21,921 | 89.90% | ▼2.39 |
| Registered electors | | 24,384 | | ▲15.42 |
| INC gain from NCP | | Swing | ▲1.31 | |

=== 2002 Assembly election ===
2002 Manipur Legislative Assembly election: Hiyanglam
| Party | Candidate | Votes | % | ±% |
|---|---|---|---|---|
| NCP | Elangbam Biramani Singh | 6,095 | 31.26% | New |
| FPM | Maibam Kunjo | 4,841 | 24.83% | ▲11.68 |
| INC | Elangbam Dwijamani Singh | 3,832 | 19.65% | ▲4.28 |
| MSCP | Ningthoujam Rajendro | 2,484 | 12.74% | ▼17.07 |
| BJP | Leiphrakpam Ashokumar Singh | 2,076 | 10.65% | ▲4.53 |
| Margin of victory | | 1,254 | 6.43% | ▼2.91 |
| Turnout | | 19,497 | 92.29% | ▲0.78 |
| Registered electors | | 21,126 | | ▲4.81 |
| NCP gain from MSCP | | Swing | ▲1.45 | |

=== 2000 Assembly election ===
2000 Manipur Legislative Assembly election: Hiyanglam
| Party | Candidate | Votes | % | ±% |
|---|---|---|---|---|
| MSCP | Maibam Kunjo Singh | 5,498 | 29.81% | New |
| MPP | Elangbam Biramani Singh | 3,774 | 20.46% | ▼2.51 |
| INC | Elangbam Dwijamani Singh | 2,835 | 15.37% | ▼18.90 |
| CPI | Elangbam Jadumani Singh | 2,603 | 14.11% | New |
| FPM | Ningthoujam Rajendro | 2,426 | 13.15% | New |
| BJP | Leiphrakpam Ashokumar Singh | 1,128 | 6.12% | New |
| Margin of victory | | 1,724 | 9.35% | ▲2.17 |
| Turnout | | 18,445 | 91.51% | ▼1.64 |
| Registered electors | | 20,157 | | ▲14.13 |
| MSCP gain from JD | | Swing | ▼11.63 | |

=== 1995 Assembly election ===
1995 Manipur Legislative Assembly election: Hiyanglam
| Party | Candidate | Votes | % | ±% |
|---|---|---|---|---|
| JD | Maibam Kunjo Singh | 6,817 | 41.44% | ▲8.37 |
| INC | Elangbam Biramani Singh | 5,637 | 34.27% | ▲0.24 |
| MPP | Huidrom Rajbabu | 3,779 | 22.97% | New |
| Margin of victory | | 1,180 | 7.17% | ▲6.21 |
| Turnout | | 16,451 | 93.14% | ▲3.16 |
| Registered electors | | 17,662 | | ▲7.17 |
| JD gain from INC | | Swing | | |

=== 1990 Assembly election ===
1990 Manipur Legislative Assembly election: Hiyanglam
| Party | Candidate | Votes | % | ±% |
|---|---|---|---|---|
| INC | Elangbam Biramani Singh | 5,047 | 34.03% | ▲5.99 |
| JD | Maibam Kunjo Singh | 4,904 | 33.07% | New |
| Independent | Huidrom Rajbapu | 3,130 | 21.10% | New |
| Independent | Toijam Ibemhal | 1,364 | 9.20% | New |
| BJP | Thounaojam Kesho | 185 | 1.25% | New |
| Margin of victory | | 143 | 0.96% | ▼0.35 |
| Turnout | | 14,831 | 89.99% | ▲4.86 |
| Registered electors | | 16,481 | | ▲2.68 |
| INC hold | | Swing | ▲5.99 | |

=== 1984 Assembly election ===
1984 Manipur Legislative Assembly election: Hiyanglam
| Party | Candidate | Votes | % | ±% |
|---|---|---|---|---|
| INC | Elangbam Biramani Singh | 3,831 | 28.04% | New |
| Independent | Maibam Kunjo | 3,651 | 26.72% | New |
| IC(S) | Huidrom Rajbabu | 3,020 | 22.10% | New |
| CPI | Ningthoujam Yaiskul | 1,676 | 12.27% | ▼15.50 |
| Independent | Elangbam Babudhon | 700 | 5.12% | New |
| JP | Elangbam Ningthemjao | 436 | 3.19% | ▼18.51 |
| Margin of victory | | 180 | 1.32% | ▼2.35 |
| Turnout | | 13,664 | 85.13% | ▼0.86 |
| Registered electors | | 16,051 | | ▲9.91 |
| INC gain from CPI | | Swing | ▲0.27 | |

=== 1980 Assembly election ===
1980 Manipur Legislative Assembly election: Hiyanglam
| Party | Candidate | Votes | % | ±% |
|---|---|---|---|---|
| CPI | Elangbam Babudhon | 3,487 | 27.77% | ▲8.26 |
| INC(U) | Elangbam Biramani Singh | 3,027 | 24.10% | New |
| JP | Hudirom Rajbabu | 2,725 | 21.70% | New |
| INC(I) | Maibam Kunjo | 2,711 | 21.59% | New |
| MPP | Ibobi Salam | 369 | 2.94% | ▼16.82 |
| Margin of victory | | 460 | 3.66% | ▲3.41 |
| Turnout | | 12,558 | 85.99% | ▼2.80 |
| Registered electors | | 14,604 | | ▲34.25 |
| CPI gain from MPP | | Swing | ▲8.01 | |

=== 1974 Assembly election ===
1974 Manipur Legislative Assembly election: Hiyanglam
| Party | Candidate | Votes | % | ±% |
|---|---|---|---|---|
| MPP | Maibam Kunjo | 1,908 | 19.75% | ▲3.56 |
| CPI | Elangbam Babudhan | 1,884 | 19.51% | ▼2.16 |
| Socialist Party (India) | Huidrom Rajbapu | 1,796 | 18.59% | ▼4.43 |
| INC | Elangbani Biramani | 1,356 | 14.04% | ▼8.05 |
| Independent | Yumnam Angouba | 1,321 | 13.68% | New |
| Independent | Ningthoujam Amuba | 1,174 | 12.15% | New |
| Margin of victory | | 24 | 0.25% | ▼0.68 |
| Turnout | | 9,659 | 88.79% | ▲7.86 |
| Registered electors | | 10,878 | | ▼5.90 |
| MPP gain from Socialist Party (India) | | Swing | ▼3.27 | |

=== 1972 Assembly election ===
1972 Manipur Legislative Assembly election: Hiyanglam
| Party | Candidate | Votes | % | ±% |
|---|---|---|---|---|
| Socialist Party (India) | Kuidraom Rajbapu Singh | 2,154 | 23.02% | New |
| INC | Naorem Kanhai Singh | 2,067 | 22.09% | ▲2.1 |
| CPI | Yumanam Kanhai Singh | 2,027 | 21.67% | New |
| MPP | Maibam Kunjo Singh | 1,515 | 16.19% | New |
| Independent | Elangram Nipamacha | 954 | 10.20% | New |
| INC(O) | Elangbam Ningthemjao | 425 | 4.54% | New |
| Margin of victory | | 87 | 0.93% | ▼2.15 |
| Turnout | | 9,356 | 80.93% | ▲7.73 |
| Registered electors | | 11,560 | | ▼37.40 |
| Socialist Party (India) gain from SSP | | Swing | ▼0.06 | |

=== 1967 Assembly election ===
1967 Manipur Legislative Assembly election: Hiyanglam
| Party | Candidate | Votes | % | ±% |
|---|---|---|---|---|
| SSP | T. Anoubi | 3,120 | 23.08% | New |
| INC | N. Kanhai | 2,703 | 20.00% | New |
| Independent | K. N. Singh | 1,774 | 13.12% | New |
| Independent | E. Biramani | 1,663 | 12.30% | New |
| Independent | E. Gandha | 1,494 | 11.05% | New |
| Independent | E. Nodi | 1,163 | 8.60% | New |
| Independent | H. Amuchou | 946 | 7.00% | New |
| Independent | M. Apabi | 99 | 0.73% | New |
| PSP | K. Ibohal | 74 | 0.55% | New |
| Margin of victory | | 417 | 3.08% | |
| Turnout | | 13,518 | 73.20% | |
| Registered electors | | 18,467 | | |
| SSP win (new seat) | | | | |

== See also ==
- List of constituencies of the Manipur Legislative Assembly
- Thoubal district
