= Churachandpur Assembly constituency =

Constituency of the Manipur legislative assembly in India

Coordinates: 24.342°N 93.703°E

Churachandpur
- Constituency for the Manipur Legislative Assembly

Constituency details
- Country: India
- Region: Northeast India
- State: Manipur
- District: Churachandpur
- Lok Sabha constituency: Outer Manipur
- Established: 1962
- Total electors: 65,325
- Reservation: ST

Member of Legislative Assembly
- 12th Manipur Legislative Assembly
- Incumbent LM Khaute
- Party: Bharatiya Janata Party
- Elected year: 2022

Churachandpur is one of the 60 Vidhan Sabha constituencies in the Indian state of Manipur that makes up the Manipur Legislative Assembly.

== Members of the Legislative Assembly ==
Year	Member	Party
1962	Paoneikhai Suantak	Indian National Congress
1967	Lalrokung	Independent politician
1968 (by-election)	Ngurdinglien Sanate	Independent politician
1972	Haokholal Thangjom	Independent politician
1974	Haokholal Thangjom	Manipur Hills Union
1980	K. Vungzalian	Independent politician
1984	J. F. Rothangliana	Kuki National Assembly
1990	V. Hangkhanlian	Nagaland Peoples Party
1995	V. Hangkhanlian	Nagaland Peoples Party
2000	V. Hangkhanlian	Manipur State Congress Party
2002	T. Phungzathang	Indian National Congress
2007	Phungzathang Tonsing	Indian National Congress
2012	Phungzathang Tonsing	Indian National Congress
2017	V. Hangkhanlian	Bharatiya Janata Party
2022	L. M. Khaute	Janata Dal (Note: Joined BJP in 2022)

== Election results ==
Vote share of winning candidates
2022	38.24%
2017	30.28%
2012	60.11%
2007	51.17%
2002	48.08%
2000	50.69%
1995	58.58%
1990	18.84%
1984	22.16%
1980	40.49%
1974	48.11%
1972	28.30%
1967	25.89%

=== 2027 Assembly election ===
2027 Manipur Legislative Assembly election: Churachandpur
Party	Candidate	Votes	%	±%
INC				
NDA				
NOTA	None of the above			
Majority				
Turnout				
gain from		Swing		

=== 2022 Assembly election ===
2022 Manipur Legislative Assembly election: Churachandpur
Party	Candidate	Votes	%	±%
JD(U)	L. M. Khaute	18,231	38.24%	
BJP	V. Hangkhanlian	17,607	36.93%	6.66%
INC	H. Mangchinkhup Paite	8,482	17.79%	16.21%
Independent	James Khuma Hauzel	2,244	4.71%	
NPP	Th. Thangzalian	515	1.08%	
KNA	Dr. Jainson Haokip D. D.	248	0.52%	
Margin of victory		624	1.31%	−0.51%
Turnout		47,671	72.98%	10.44%
Registered electors		65,325		20.72%
JD(U) gain from BJP		Swing	7.97%	

=== 2017 Assembly election ===
2017 Manipur Legislative Assembly election: Churachandpur
Party	Candidate	Votes	%	±%
BJP	V. Hangkhanlian	10,246	30.28%	
NPP	Phungzathang Tonsing	9,632	28.46%	
NEIDP	Paukhansuan Khuptong	6,411	18.95%	
RPI(A)	Thangbiaklian Hangzo	3,712	10.97%	
Independent	Chintwahlian @ C. T. Lian Guite	3,040	8.98%	
INC	Haukhanthang	535	1.58%	−58.53%
Margin of victory		614	1.81%	−23.94%
Turnout		33,840	62.54%	−1.59%
Registered electors		54,113		15.30%
BJP gain from INC		Swing	-29.84%	

=== 2012 Assembly election ===
2012 Manipur Legislative Assembly election: Churachandpur
Party	Candidate	Votes	%	±%
INC	Phungzathang Tonsing	18,093	60.11%	8.94%
AITC	P. Songlianlal	10,342	34.36%	
NCP	K. Vungzalian	1,408	4.68%	
Independent	Chintuahlian Guite	170	0.56%	
Margin of victory		7,751	25.75%	21.04%
Turnout		30,098	64.13%	−14.46%
Registered electors		46,933		3.52%
INC hold		Swing	8.94%	

=== 2007 Assembly election ===
2007 Manipur Legislative Assembly election: Churachandpur
Party	Candidate	Votes	%	±%
INC	Phungzathang Tonsing	18,233	51.17%	3.09%
NCP	V. Langkhanpau Guite	16,554	46.46%	
Independent	G. Thangboy	441	1.24%	
Independent	William	198	0.56%	
Margin of victory		1,679	4.71%	3.99%
Turnout		35,632	78.59%	−5.47%
Registered electors		45,339		17.36%
INC hold		Swing	3.09%	

=== 2002 Assembly election ===
2002 Manipur Legislative Assembly election: Churachandpur
Party	Candidate	Votes	%	±%
INC	T. Phungzathang	15,271	48.08%	0.14%
NCP	V. Hangkhanlian	15,043	47.36%	46.47%
SAP	Lalhriet	615	1.94%	
Independent	Ginmuanlam	508	1.60%	
Margin of victory		228	0.72%	−2.03%
Turnout		31,760	84.06%	2.73%
Registered electors		38,634		4.04%
INC gain from MSCP		Swing	-10.49%	

=== 2000 Assembly election ===
2000 Manipur Legislative Assembly election: Churachandpur
Party	Candidate	Votes	%	±%
MSCP	V. Hangkhanlian	15,666	50.69%	
INC	T. Phungzathang	14,818	47.94%	42.70%
NCP	Khualkhanthang	278	0.90%	
Margin of victory		848	2.74%	−30.49%
Turnout		30,907	84.39%	3.06%
Registered electors		37,135		19.25%
MSCP gain from MPP		Swing	-7.89%	

=== 1995 Assembly election ===
1995 Manipur Legislative Assembly election: Churachandpur
Party	Candidate	Votes	%	±%
Nagaland People's Party	V. Hangkhanlian	14,641	58.58%	
MPP	K. Vungzalian	6,335	25.35%	
JD	Jamkholam	2,560	10.24%	
INC	Hathoi Buansing	1,310	5.24%	−3.52%
Margin of victory		8,306	33.23%	28.92%
Turnout		24,995	81.33%	−6.75%
Registered electors		31,141		37.12%
MPP hold		Swing	39.73%	

=== 1990 Assembly election ===
1990 Manipur Legislative Assembly election: Churachandpur
Party	Candidate	Votes	%	±%
MPP	V. Hangkhanlian	3,705	18.84%	
JD	S. Ngulsing	2,858	14.53%	
Independent	K. Vungzalian	2,816	14.32%	
KNA	Kampu Gangte	2,649	13.47%	
Independent	Rothangliana	2,184	11.11%	
INC	Hathoi Buansing	1,722	8.76%	−12.69%
INS(SCS)	Haokholal Thangjom	1,478	7.52%	
Independent	Lalhaming Mawia	1,443	7.34%	
Independent	T. Gougin	730	3.71%	
Margin of victory		847	4.31%	3.59%
Turnout		19,664	88.08%	10.00%
Registered electors		22,710		37.07%
MPP gain from KNA		Swing	-3.32%	

=== 1984 Assembly election ===
1984 Manipur Legislative Assembly election: Churachandpur
Party	Candidate	Votes	%	±%
KNA	J. F. Rothangliana	2,797	22.16%	
INC	K. Vungzalian	2,707	21.45%	
Independent	Haokholal Thangjom	2,276	18.03%	
Independent	Thuamson	2,204	17.46%	
Independent	Tinlianthang	2,053	16.27%	
Independent	Khamkholal Guite	222	1.76%	
Independent	Haulianthang	160	1.27%	
Independent	Manlianuiang	160	1.27%	
Margin of victory		90	0.71%	−10.25%
Turnout		12,622	78.07%	−1.18%
Registered electors		16,568		17.35%
KNA gain from Independent		Swing	-18.33%	

=== 1980 Assembly election ===
1980 Manipur Legislative Assembly election: Churachandpur
Party	Candidate	Votes	%	±%
Independent	K. Vungzalian	4,431	40.49%	
INC(I)	Baukholal Thangjem	3,231	29.53%	
Independent	C. Rokhuma	2,526	23.08%	
JP	Pauneikhai Vaiphei	685	6.26%	
Independent	Hauneipau	70	0.64%	
Margin of victory		1,200	10.97%	−10.91%
Turnout		10,943	79.25%	1.68%
Registered electors		14,119		21.93%
Independent gain from Manipur Hills Union		Swing	-7.62%	

=== 1974 Assembly election ===
1974 Manipur Legislative Assembly election: Churachandpur
Party	Candidate	Votes	%	±%
Manipur Hills Union	Haukholal Thangjom	4,242	48.11%	
INC	T. Kaigou	2,313	26.23%	0.95%
Independent	Thanzuala	2,262	25.65%	
Margin of victory		1,929	21.88%	18.86%
Turnout		8,817	77.57%	−0.50%
Registered electors		11,580		−10.52%
Manipur Hills Union gain from Independent		Swing	19.81%	

=== 1972 Assembly election ===
1972 Manipur Legislative Assembly election: Churachandpur
Party	Candidate	Votes	%	±%
Independent	Haokholal Thangjom	2,824	28.30%	
INC	Goukhenpau	2,523	25.29%	10.01%
Independent	Roulneikhum	2,217	22.22%	
Independent	Khotinlal	1,497	15.00%	
Independent	Khantkhojam	917	9.19%	
Margin of victory		301	3.02%	−3.56%
Turnout		9,978	78.07%	−0.42%
Registered electors		12,941		−28.97%
Independent hold		Swing	2.41%	

=== 1967 Assembly election ===
1967 Manipur Legislative Assembly election: Churachandpur
Party	Candidate	Votes	%	±%
Independent	Lalroukung	3,558	25.89%	
Independent	Semkhupau	2,654	19.31%	
Independent	H. Thongjom	2,643	19.23%	
INC	Pauneikhai	2,099	15.28%	
Independent	Somkholal	1,886	13.73%	
Independent	R. Sena	593	4.32%	
Independent	K. A. Khaijang	308	2.24%	
Margin of victory		904	6.58%	
Turnout		13,741	78.49%	
Registered electors		18,219		

== See also ==
- List of constituencies of the Manipur Legislative Assembly
- Churachandpur district
