= Thokchom Lokeshwar Singh =

Indian politician

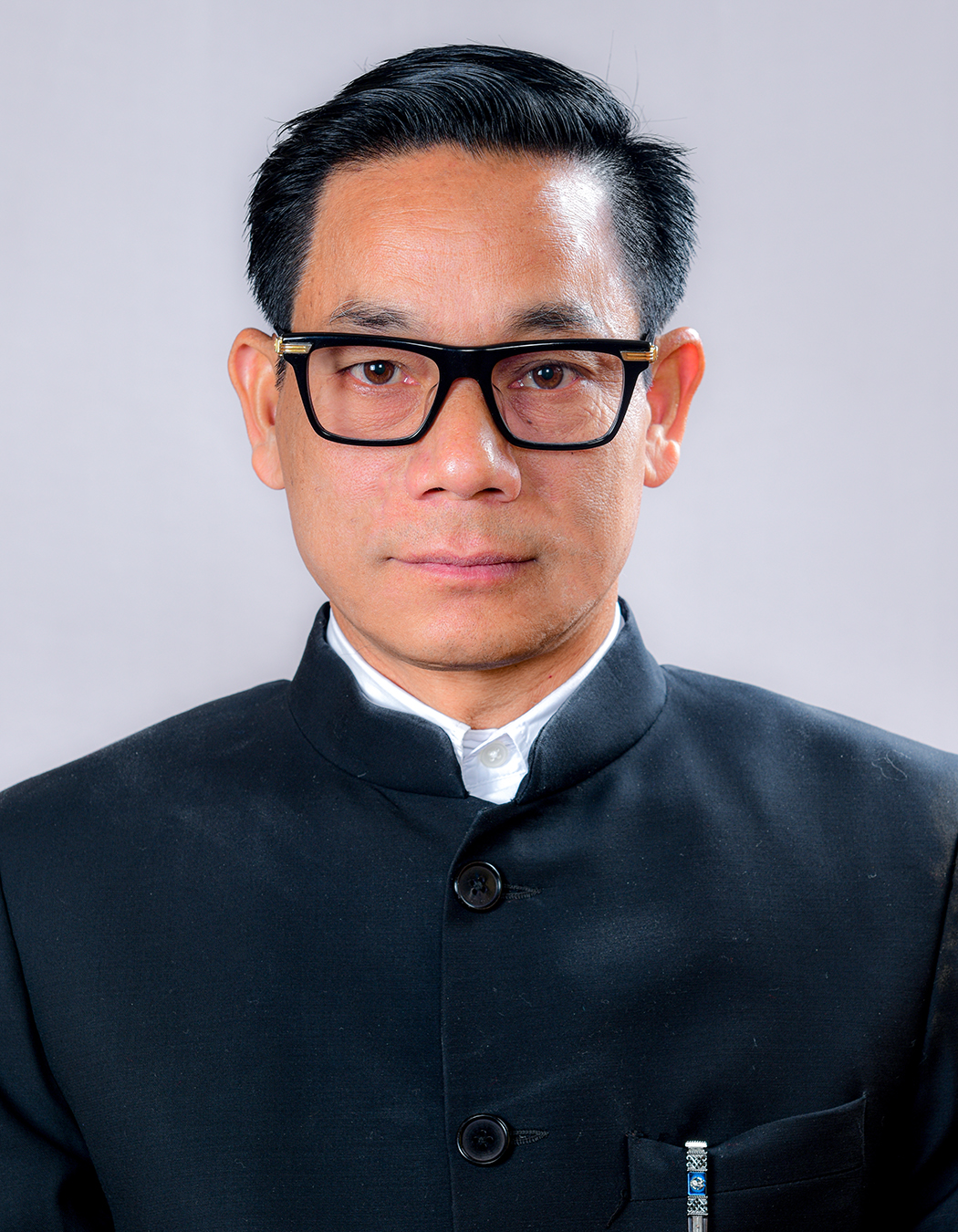

Member of the Manipur Legislative Assembly
- Incumbent
- Assumed office 2012
- Preceded by: Thokchom Navakumar Singh
- Constituency: Khundrakpam

Personal details
- Born: 1 January 1967 (age 59) Manipur, India
- Party: Indian National Congress
- Parent: Thokchom Navakumar Singh

Thokchom Lokeshwar Singh (born 1967) is an Indian politician from Manipur. He is a three-time Member of the Manipur Legislative Assembly from Khundrakpam, representing the Indian National Congress.

== Early life and education ==
Singh is from Khundrakpam, Imphal East District, Manipur. He is the son of Thokchom Navakumar Singh. He completed his M.A. in 2003 at Manipur University.

== Career ==
Singh became an MLA for the first time in the 2012 Manipur Legislative Assembly election when he defeated Laishram Premchandra Singh of Communist Party of India by 582 votes. He retained the seat in the 2017 Manipur Legislative Assembly election defeating Thangjam Mohendro Singh of the Bharatiya Janata Party (BJP) by 3,509 votes. He won the Khundrakpam seat for Congress for the third consecutive term in the 2022 Manipur Legislative Assembly election. In 2022, he polled 12,211 votes and defeated his nearest rival, Thangjam Mohendro Singh of the BJP, by 215 votes.
