= Yumnam Radheshyam =

Indian politician

Dr Yumnam Radheshyam

Member of the Manipur Legislative Assembly
- Incumbent
- Assumed office 2017
- Preceded by: Elangbam Dijamani
- Constituency: Hiyanglam

Personal details
- Born: Radheshyam Yumnam; 1960 (age 65–66) Langmeidomg
- Party: Bhartiya Janata Party
- Parent: Y.Mangol (father)
- Education: MBBS
- Profession: Politician, Doctor

Yumnam Radheshyam is an Indian politician from Manipur. He was elected to the Manipur Legislative Assembly from Hiyanglam in the 2017 Manipur Legislative Assembly election as a member of the Bhartiya Janata Party.
