= Thokchom Navakumar Singh =

Indian politician

Member of Manipur Legislative Assembly
- In office 2007 – 2012
- Preceded by: Lairellakpam Lala
- Succeeded by: Thokchom Lokeshwar Singh
- Constituency: Khundrakpam

Personal details
- Children: Thokchom Lokeshwar Singh

Thokchom Navakumar Singh is an Indian politician. He is a former Member of the Manipur Legislative Assembly from the Khundrakpam Assembly constituency. He won as a candidate of Nationalist Congress Party in the 2007 Manipur Assembly election.

He had contested the same seat in 2002 as an Indian National Congress candidate, then finishing in fifth place. His son Thokchom Lokeshwar Singh has before and followed him in the Manipur Legislative Assembly from 2012 to 2017.
