= Khundrakpam Assembly constituency =

Legislative Assembly constituency in Manipur State, India

Coordinates: 24.89°N 93.98°E

Khundrakpam
- Constituency No. 1 for the Manipur Legislative Assembly
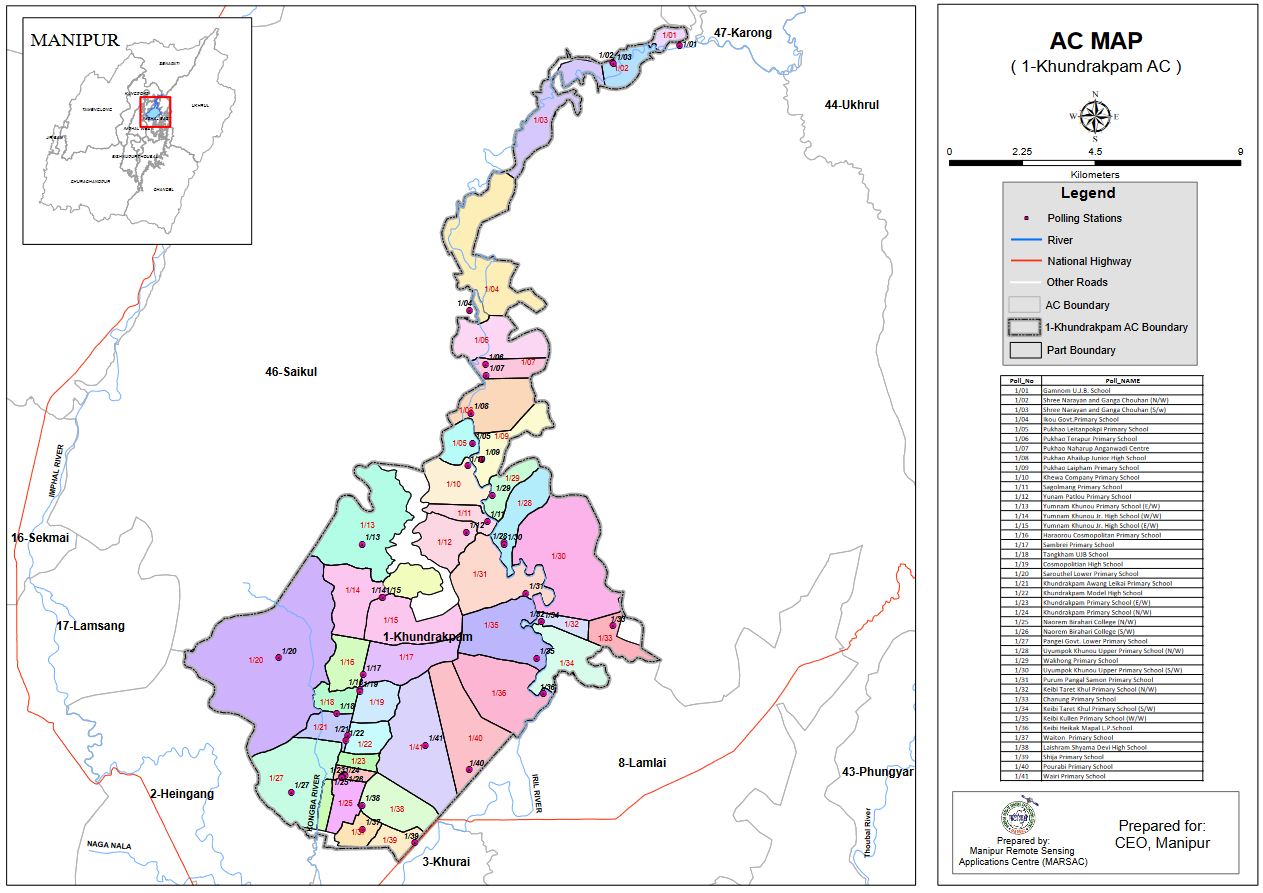

Constituency details
- Country: India
- Region: Northeast India
- State: Manipur
- District: Imphal East
- Lok Sabha constituency: Inner Manipur
- Established: 1972
- Total electors: 27,777
- Reservation: None

Member of Legislative Assembly
- 12th Manipur Legislative Assembly
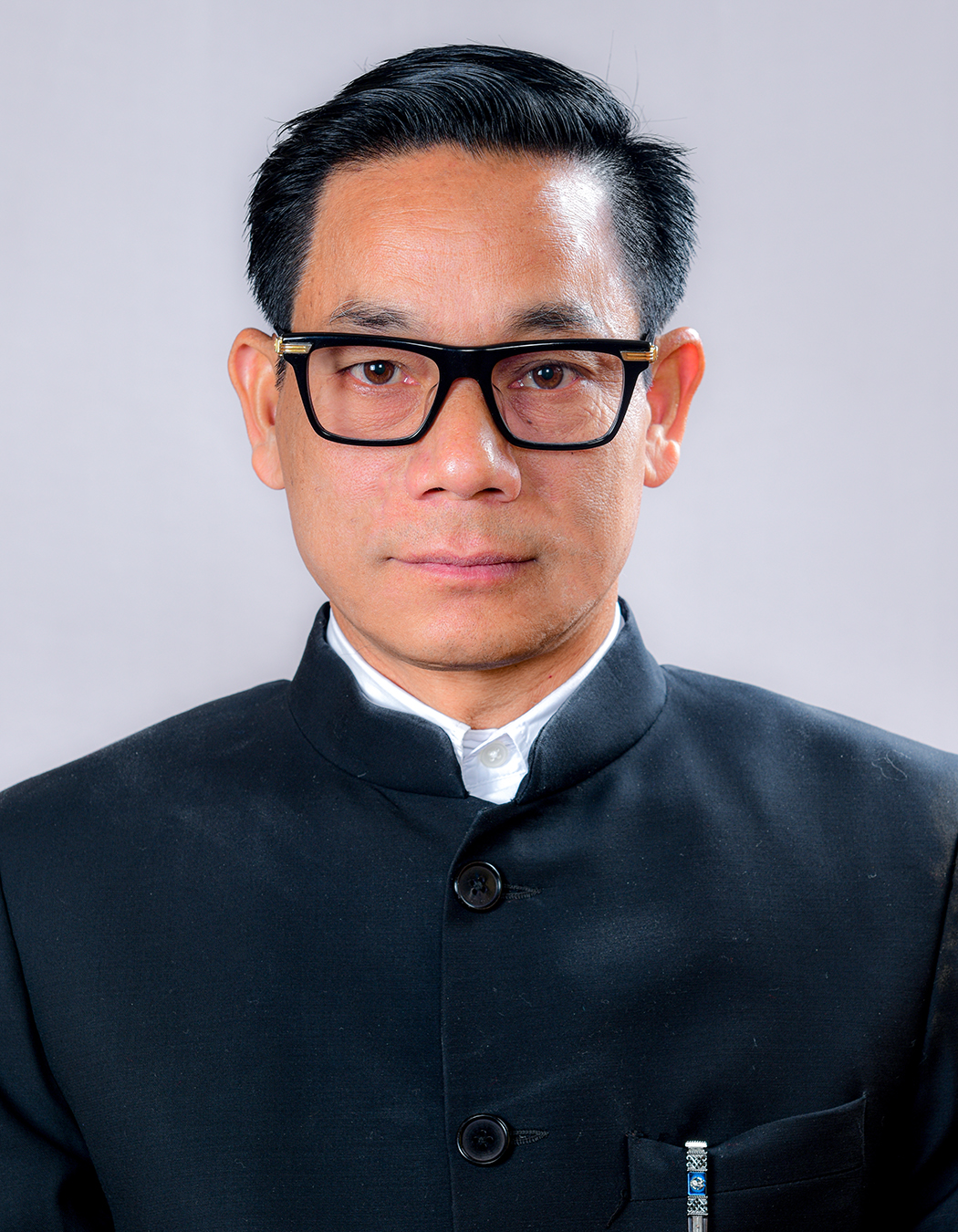
- Incumbent Thokchom Lokeshwar Singh
- Party: INC
- Elected year: 2022

Khundrakpam is one of the 60 Vidhan Sabha constituencies in the Indian state of Manipur.

== Extent ==
In terms of sequence of Manipur state assembly constituencies, Khundrakpam Assembly constituency is numbered first among the 60 constituencies of Manipur. It has 41 parts, namely: 1-Matakhong, 2-Hangoipat (A), 3-Hangoipat (B), 4-Ikou, 5-Sadu Yenkhuman, 6-Leitanpokpi, 7-Pukhao Terapur, 8-Pukhao Naharup, 9-Pukhao Khabam, 10-Pukhao Laipham, 11-Khewa Company, 12-Sagolmang, 13-Yumnam Patlou, 14-Sinam, 15-Yumnam Khunou (A), 16-Yumnam Khunou (B), 17-Haraorou, 18-Shambei, 19-Tangkham, 20-Chingkhu, 21-Sarouthel, 22-Khundrakpam Awang Leikai, 23-Khundrakpam, 24-Khundrakpam Makha Leikai, 25-Khundrakpam Maning Leikai, 26-Pangei Yangdong (A), 27-Pangei Yangdong (B), 28-Pangei Meiteikhul, 29-Uyumpok Maning Leikai, 30. Wakhong, 31-Uyumpok, 32-Tiger Camp, 33-Keibi Taret Khul (A), 34-Chanung, 35-Keibi Taret Khul (B), 36-Keibi, 37-Keibi Heikak Mapal, 38-Waiton Makha Leikai, 39-Waiton Awang Leikai, 40-Chingarel Tejpur, 41-Pourabi, and 42-Wairi.

== Members of Legislative Assembly ==
Year	Winner	Party
1972	Thokchom Kunjo Singh	Indian National Congress
1974	Maibam Hera Lairellakpam	Communist Party of India
1980	Yumlembam Kulla	Communist Party of India
1984	Lairellakpam Lala	Independent politician
1995	Konjengbam Binoy	Manipur Peoples Party
1998 by-election	Lairellakpam Lala	Manipur State Congress Party
2000	Konsam Tomba	Manipur Peoples Party
2002	Lairellakpam Lala	Samata Party
2007	Thokchom Navakumar Singh	Nationalist Congress Party
2012	Thokchom Lokeshwar Singh	Indian National Congress
2017	Thokchom Lokeshwar Singh	Indian National Congress
2022	Thokchom Lokeshwar Singh	Indian National Congress

== Election results ==
Vote share of winning candidates
2022	49.02%
2017	56.12%
2012	49.37%
2007	17.31%
2002	19.10%
2000	22.21%
1998 by-election	18.09%
1995	40.61%
1984	23.73%
1980	20.08%
1974	41.53%
1972	25.66%

=== 2027 Assembly election ===
2027 Manipur Legislative Assembly election: Khundrakpam
Party	Candidate	Votes	%	±%
INC				
NDA				
NOTA	None of the above			
Majority				
Turnout				
gain from		Swing		

=== 2022 Assembly election ===
2022 Manipur Legislative Assembly election: Khundrakpam
Party	Candidate	Votes	%	±%
INC	Thokchom Lokeshwar Singh	12,211	49.02%	▼7.10
BJP	Thangjam Mohendro Singh	11,996	48.16%	▲5.40
RPI(A)	Elangbam Sovid Singh	497	2.00%	New
NOTA	None of the Above	167	0.67%	▲0.27
Margin of victory		215	0.86%	▼12.50
Turnout		24,911	89.68%	▼0.11
Registered electors		27,777		▲8.93
INC hold		Swing	▼7.10	

=== 2017 Assembly election ===
2017 Manipur Legislative Assembly election: Khundrakpam
Party	Candidate	Votes	%	±%
INC	Thokchom Lokeshwar Singh	12,849	56.12%	▲6.75
BJP	Thangjam Mohendro Singh	9,790	42.76%	▲22.98
CPI(M)	Yumlembam Jogendro	129	0.56%	New
NOTA	None of the Above	92	0.40%	New
Margin of victory		3,059	13.36%	▼16.23
Turnout		22,896	89.79%	▲6.43
Registered electors		25,500		▲14.29
INC hold		Swing	▲6.75	

=== 2012 Assembly election ===
2012 Manipur Legislative Assembly election: Khundrakpam
Party	Candidate	Votes	%	±%
INC	Thokchom Lokeshwar Singh	9,182	49.37%	▲35.18
BJP	I. Mangiton	3,678	19.78%	New
CPI	L. Premchandra	2,096	11.27%	▼2.99
AITC	Konsam Tomba	1,577	8.48%	New
NCP	Namoijam Singhajit Singh	1,435	7.72%	▼9.59
NPP	R. Michael Koireng	419	2.25%	New
MSCP	L. Lala Singh	211	1.13%	New
Margin of victory		5,504	29.59%	▲26.55
Turnout		18,598	83.35%	▲1.07
Registered electors		22,312		▼3.87
INC gain from NCP		Swing	▲32.07	

=== 2007 Assembly election ===
2007 Manipur Legislative Assembly election: Khundrakpam
Party	Candidate	Votes	%	±%
NCP	Thokchom Navakumar Singh	3,305	17.31%	▲4.20
CPI	Laishram Premchandra Singh	2,723	14.26%	▲9.97
INC	Konsam Tomba	2,711	14.20%	▲2.56
LJP	Thangjam Shyam	2,286	11.97%	New
RJD	Longjam Tomchou Meitei	2,159	11.30%	New
MPP	Lairellakpam Lala	1,817	9.51%	▲6.26
JD(S)	Lairenlakpam Sharatchandra Singh	1,794	9.39%	New
CPI(M)	Namoijam Singhajit Singh	1,232	6.45%	▲4.46
SP	Moirangthem Sharat Singh	503	2.63%	New
JD(U)	Irom Mangiton	491	2.57%	New
Margin of victory		582	3.05%	▲0.50
Turnout		19,098	82.28%	▼4.05
Registered electors		23,210		▲17.50
NCP gain from SAP		Swing	▼1.80	

=== 2002 Assembly election ===
2002 Manipur Legislative Assembly election: Khundrakpam
Party	Candidate	Votes	%	±%
SAP	Lairellakpam Lala	3,258	19.10%	New
FPM	Konsam Tomba	2,824	16.56%	▲10.63
BJP	Thangjam Shyam	2,614	15.33%	▲7.49
NCP	Moirangthem Sharat Singh	2,235	13.11%	New
INC	Thokchom Navakumar Singh	1,984	11.63%	▲0.58
MSCP	Sorokhaibam Saratchandra	1,155	6.77%	▼12.90
DRPP	Lairenlakpam Sharatchandra Singh	1,061	6.22%	New
CPI	Laishram Premchandra Singh	732	4.29%	New
MPP	Irom Mangiton Singh	555	3.25%	▼18.96
CPI(M)	Thoudam Nilakamal	340	1.99%	▼3.01
Margin of victory		434	2.54%	▲0.00
Turnout		17,054	86.34%	▼28.39
Registered electors		19,753		▲17.63
SAP gain from MPP		Swing	▼3.11	

=== 2000 Assembly election ===
2000 Manipur Legislative Assembly election: Khundrakpam
Party	Candidate	Votes	%	±%
MPP	Konsam Tomba	4,279	22.21%	▲5.44
MSCP	Lairellakpam Lala	3,789	19.67%	▲1.58
JD(S)	Thokchom Navakumar Singh	2,422	12.57%	New
INC	Thangjam Shyam	2,129	11.05%	▼4.03
BJP	Waikhom Shiamkishore	1,509	7.83%	New
FPM	Lairenlakpam Sharatchandra Singh	1,142	5.93%	▼4.68
CPI(M)	Yumnam Ratan	963	5.00%	▼7.79
Margin of victory		490	2.54%	▲1.23
Turnout		16,792	87.16%	▲31.59
Registered electors		19,264		▼10.38
MPP gain from MSCP		Swing	▲4.13	

=== 1998 Assembly by-election ===
1998 Manipur Legislative Assembly by-election: Khundrakpam
Party	Candidate	Votes	%	±%
MSCP	Lairellakpam Lala	2,817	18.09%	New
MPP	Konsam Tomba	2,613	16.78%	▼23.84
INC	Thangjam Shyam	2,349	15.08%	▲5.23
JD	Waikhom Shiamkishore	2,127	13.66%	▲9.54
CPI(M)	Th. Nilakamal	1,992	12.79%	▲0.42
FPM	Y. Rajen	1,652	10.61%	▼10.46
SAP	Th. Nabakumar	1,101	7.07%	New
RJD	N. Jila	839	5.39%	New
Independent	Th. Biren	86	0.55%	New
Margin of victory		204	1.31%	▼18.23
Turnout		15,576	84.44%	▼4.25
Registered electors		18,736		▲3.25
MSCP gain from MPP		Swing	▼22.53	

=== 1995 Assembly election ===
1995 Manipur Legislative Assembly election: Khundrakpam
Party	Candidate	Votes	%	±%
MPP	Konjengbam Binoy	6,440	40.61%	▲29.02
FPM	Lairellakpam Lala	3,341	21.07%	New
CPI(M)	Thoudam Nilakamal	1,961	12.37%	▲6.69
CPI	Tonjam Shyamkishwor	1,629	10.27%	▼2.00
INC	Thangjam Shyam	1,562	9.85%	▼9.35
JD	Nongthombam Jila	652	4.11%	New
Margin of victory		3,099	19.54%	▲15.01
Turnout		15,857	87.39%	▲9.44
Registered electors		18,146		▲20.01
MPP gain from Independent		Swing	▲16.88	

=== 1984 Assembly election ===
1984 Manipur Legislative Assembly election: Khundrakpam
Party	Candidate	Votes	%	±%
Independent	Lairellakpam Lala	2,797	23.73%	New
INC	Konsam Tomba	2,263	19.20%	New
Independent	Langoljam Tikendra	1,764	14.97%	New
CPI	Tonjam Shyamkishwor	1,446	12.27%	New
MPP	Lairellakpam Gourahari	1,366	11.59%	▼3.08
CPI(M)	Yumlembam Kulla	669	5.68%	▼14.41
Independent	Maibam Gouranityai	590	5.01%	New
BJP	Leitanthem Sagor	437	3.71%	New
Margin of victory		534	4.53%	▼0.81
Turnout		11,786	77.95%	▲6.92
Registered electors		15,120		▼3.76
Independent gain from CPI(M)		Swing	▲3.65	

=== 1980 Assembly election ===
1980 Manipur Legislative Assembly election: Khundrakpam
Party	Candidate	Votes	%	±%
CPI(M)	Yumlembam Kulla	2,241	20.08%	▲6.24
Independent	Langonjan Tikendra	1,645	14.74%	New
Independent	Lairellakpam Lala	1,645	14.74%	New
MPP	Konsam Tomba	1,637	14.67%	▼5.67
Independent	Saikhom Brajagopal	1,095	9.81%	New
JP	Lairellakpam Gourahari	1,063	9.53%	New
INC(I)	Maibam Hera Lairellakpam	565	5.06%	New
Independent	Leitanthem Sagor	498	4.46%	New
Independent	Darshan	128	1.15%	New
Independent	Telem Bira	82	0.73%	New
Margin of victory		596	5.34%	▼15.85
Turnout		11,159	71.03%	▼6.08
Registered electors		15,710		▲41.05
CPI(M) gain from CPI		Swing	▼21.45	

=== 1974 Assembly election ===
1974 Manipur Legislative Assembly election: Khundrakpam
Party	Candidate	Votes	%	±%
CPI	Maibam Hera Lairellakpam	3,567	41.53%	▲18.82
MPP	Gourahari Singh	1,747	20.34%	▼1.32
Independent	Laitonjam Jatra Singh	1,664	19.37%	New
CPI(M)	Yumlembam Kulla	1,189	13.84%	New
INC(O)	Telem Bira	236	2.75%	▼17.55
Margin of victory		1,820	21.19%	▲18.24
Turnout		8,589	77.11%	▼8.19
Registered electors		11,138		▲30.85
CPI gain from INC		Swing	▲15.87	

=== 1972 Assembly election ===
1972 Manipur Legislative Assembly election: Khundrakpam
Party	Candidate	Votes	%	±%
INC	Thokchom Kunjo Singh	1,863	25.66%	New
CPI	Maibam Hera Lairellakpam	1,649	22.71%	New
MPP	Salam Tombi	1,573	21.66%	New
INC(O)	Lourembam Birchandra	1,474	20.30%	New
Socialist Party (India)	Senjam Damudor Singh	538	7.41%	New
Margin of victory		214	2.95%	
Turnout		7,261	85.30%	
Registered electors		8,512		
INC win (new seat)				

== See also ==
- List of constituencies of the Manipur Legislative Assembly
- Imphal East district
