= Langthabal Assembly constituency =

Legislative Assembly constituency in Manipur State, India

Coordinates: 24.745°N 93.915°E

Langthabal
- Constituency No. 20 for the Manipur Legislative Assembly

Constituency details
- Country: India
- Region: Northeast India
- State: Manipur
- District: Imphal West
- Lok Sabha constituency: Inner Manipur
- Established: 1974
- Total electors: 28,413
- Reservation: None

Member of Legislative Assembly
- 12th Manipur Legislative Assembly
- Incumbent Karam Shyam
- Party: BJP
- Elected year: 2022

Langthabal (Vidhan Sabha constituency) is one of the 60 Vidhan Sabha constituencies in the Indian state of Manipur.

== Extent ==
Langthabal is the 20th of 60 constituencies of Manipur. It consists of 40 parts namely: 1 - Ahongsangbam Leikai, 2 - Oinam Thingel Khongnangpheidekpi (A), 3 - Oinam Thingel Khongnangpheidekpi (B), 4 - Sorokhaibam Makha Leikai, 5 - Sorokhaibam Leikai Awang, 6 - Maibam Makha Leikai, 7 - Maibam Awang Leikai, 8 - Maibam Mayai Leikai, 9 - Ashem Leikai, 10 - Waikhom Leikai, 11 - Oinam Leikai, 12 - Kakwa Laiphrakpam Leikai, 13 - Kakwa Huidrom Leikai, 14 - Langthabal Mantrikhong Mayai Makha, 15 - Langthabal Mantrikhong Awang Mayai, 16 - Naorem Makha Leikai, 17 - Kha Naorem Leikai, 18 - Naorem Awang Leikai, 19 - Naorem Awang Mayai Leikai, 20 - Langthabal Kunja Awang Leikai Awang, 21 - Langthabal Kunja Awang Leikai Makha, 22 - Langthabal Kunja Makha Leikai Awang, 23 - Langthabal Kunja Makha Leikai Makha, 24 - Langthabal Chingkha, 25 - Langthabal Khaobum, 26 - Naran Konjil Mayai Makha Leikai, 27 - Naran Konjil Mamang Leikai, 28 - Chajing Mamang Leikai Mamang, 29 - Chajing Mamang Leikai Maning, 30 - Chajing Awang Leikai, 31 - Chajing Chingkhong Leikai, 32 - Haoreibi Awang Leikai, 33 - Karam Awang Leikai, 34 - Karam Makha Leikai, 35 - Chajing Konjeng Leikai, 36 - Chajing Lilong Leikai, 37 - Chajing Mairenkhong Maning Leikai, 38 - Chajing Mairenkhong Mamang Leikai, 39 - Haoreibi Mayai Leikai, and 40 - Haoreibi Makha Leikai.

== Members of Assembly ==
Year	Member	Party
1974	O. Joy Singh	Manipur People's Party
1980	O. Joy Singh	Janata Party
1984	O. Joy Singh	Manipur People's Party
1995	K. Babudhon Singh	Indian National Congress
2000	O. Joy Singh	Manipur People's Party
2002	O. Joy Singh	Manipur People's Party
2007	O. Joy Singh	Manipur People's Party
2012	Karam Shyam	Lok Janshakti Party
2017	Karam Shyam	Lok Janshakti Party
2022	Karam Shyam	Bharatiya Janata Party

== Election results ==
Vote share of winning candidates
2022	41.17%
2017	39.00%
2012	35.78%
2007	27.83%
2002	24.48%
2000	40.30%
1995	41.12%
1984	60.18%
1980	36.14%
1974	26.85%

=== 2027 Assembly election ===
2027 Manipur Legislative Assembly election: Langthabal
Party	Candidate	Votes	%	±%
INC				
NDA				
NOTA	None of the above			
Majority				
Turnout				
gain from		Swing		

=== 2022 Assembly election ===
2022 Manipur Legislative Assembly election: Langthabal
Party	Candidate	Votes	%	±%
BJP	Karam Shyam	10,815	41.17%	11.62%
INC	O. Joy Singh	8,762	33.36%	29.37%
NPP	Karam Nabakishor Singh	5,949	22.65%	
Independent	Hijam Somarendro Singh	504	1.92%	
NOTA	Nota	237	0.90%	
Margin of victory		2,053	7.82%	−1.63%
Turnout		26,267	92.45%	1.08%
Registered electors		28,413		5.19%
BJP gain from LJP		Swing	2.18%	

=== 2017 Assembly election ===
2017 Manipur Legislative Assembly election: Langthabal
Party	Candidate	Votes	%	±%
LJP	Karam Shyam	9,625	39.00%	
BJP	O. Joy Singh	7,294	29.55%	
NEIDP	Ningombam Nilakumar Singh	2,806	11.37%	
Manipur National Democratic Front	Mutum Dinesh Singh	2,035	8.25%	
CPI	Nongthombam Singhajit	1,819	7.37%	−12.03%
INC	Loitongbam Tilotama Devi	983	3.98%	−1.17%
Margin of victory		2,331	9.44%	4.56%
Turnout		24,681	91.37%	4.52%
Registered electors		27,012		10.79%
LJP hold		Swing	3.22%	

=== 2012 Assembly election ===
2012 Manipur Legislative Assembly election: Langthabal
Party	Candidate	Votes	%	±%
LJP	Karam Shyam	7,575	35.78%	
MPP	O. Joy Singh	6,540	30.89%	3.06%
CPI	Nongthombam Singhajit	4,107	19.40%	3.34%
MSCP	Thongam Bishwanath Singh	1,254	5.92%	0.69%
INC	Waikhom Shyama Devi	1,091	5.15%	−6.56%
AITC	Arambam Birendra Singh	607	2.87%	
Margin of victory		1,035	4.89%	−2.68%
Turnout		21,174	86.85%	−3.99%
Registered electors		24,381		6.16%
LJP gain from MPP		Swing	7.95%	

=== 2007 Assembly election ===
2007 Manipur Legislative Assembly election: Langthabal
Party	Candidate	Votes	%	±%
MPP	O. Joy Singh	5,805	27.83%	3.34%
NCP	Rebika Naorem	4,226	20.26%	9.78%
LJP	Karam Shyam	3,837	18.39%	
CPI	Nongthombam Singhajit	3,350	16.06%	
INC	Loitongbam Tilotama Devi	2,443	11.71%	−2.14%
MSCP	Yengkhom Bhaskar Dev Singh	1,091	5.23%	−12.20%
RJD	Yumnam Ranbir Singh	110	0.53%	
Margin of victory		1,579	7.57%	3.41%
Turnout		20,862	90.83%	−2.20%
Registered electors		22,967		19.30%
MPP hold		Swing	3.34%	

=== 2002 Assembly election ===
2002 Manipur Legislative Assembly election: Langthabal
Party	Candidate	Votes	%	±%
MPP	O. Joy Singh	4,353	24.48%	−15.82%
Manipur National Conference	Karam Babudhon Singh	3,614	20.33%	
MSCP	Naorem Tombi Singh	3,099	17.43%	−21.47%
INC	Laishram Diben	2,463	13.85%	
DRPP	Karam Shyam	2,302	12.95%	
NCP	Yengkhom Bhaskar Dev Singh	1,863	10.48%	−4.72%
Margin of victory		739	4.16%	2.75%
Turnout		17,779	93.04%	0.82%
Registered electors		19,251		5.97%
MPP hold		Swing	-16.64%	

=== 2000 Assembly election ===
2000 Manipur Legislative Assembly election: Langthabal
Party	Candidate	Votes	%	±%
MPP	O. Joy Singh	6,753	40.30%	−0.25%
MSCP	Karam Babudhon Singh	6,518	38.90%	
NCP	Naorem Tombi Singh	2,547	15.20%	
SAP	Hijam Somarendro Singh	504	3.01%	−7.85%
BJP	Haorongbam Mukhai	433	2.58%	
Margin of victory		235	1.40%	0.84%
Turnout		16,755	93.25%	1.03%
Registered electors		18,166		2.31%
MPP gain from INC		Swing	-0.82%	

=== 1995 Assembly election ===
1995 Manipur Legislative Assembly election: Langthabal
Party	Candidate	Votes	%	±%
INC	Karam Babudhon Singh	6,674	41.12%	
MPP	O. Joy Singh	6,582	40.56%	
SAP	H. Somarendrao Singh	1,762	10.86%	
Independent	H. Mukhai	1,002	6.17%	
FPM	Kh. Dhurba	139	0.86%	
Margin of victory		92	0.57%	
Turnout		16,229	92.22%	
Registered electors		17,756		
INC win (new seat)				

=== 1984 Assembly election ===
1984 Manipur Legislative Assembly election: Langthabal
Party	Candidate	Votes	%	±%
MPP	O. Joy Singh	7,203	60.18%	58.29%
INC	R. K. Bimol	4,767	39.82%	
Margin of victory		2,436	20.35%	15.16%
Turnout		11,970	86.15%	1.51%
Registered electors		14,257		5.60%
MPP gain from JP		Swing	24.04%	

=== 1980 Assembly election ===
1980 Manipur Legislative Assembly election: Langthabal
Party	Candidate	Votes	%	±%
JP	O. Joy Singh	4,063	36.14%	
INC(U)	Karam Babudhon Singh	3,479	30.94%	
INC(I)	Laikangbam Ibotombi Singh	3,060	27.22%	
Independent	Khuman Iboton	300	2.67%	
MPP	Laishram Dhananjoy	212	1.89%	−24.97%
Independent	Pukhhambam Orendro	100	0.89%	
Margin of victory		584	5.19%	2.94%
Turnout		11,243	84.65%	−4.59%
Registered electors		13,501		30.63%
JP gain from MPP		Swing	9.28%	

=== 1974 Assembly election ===
1974 Manipur Legislative Assembly election: Langthabal
Party	Candidate	Votes	%	±%
MPP	O. Joy Singh	2,415	26.85%	
Independent	Pukhhambam Orendro	2,212	24.60%	
Independent	Laikangbam Ibotombi Singh	1,966	21.86%	
INC	A. Biramangol	1,770	19.68%	
Independent	Naorem Shyam Singh	507	5.64%	
INC(O)	Laisram Modhu Singh	123	1.37%	
Margin of victory		203	2.26%	
Turnout		8,993	89.24%	
Registered electors		10,335		
MPP win (new seat)				

== See also ==
- Manipur Legislative Assembly
- List of constituencies of Manipur Legislative Assembly
- Imphal West district
