= Thokchom Radheshyam Singh =

Indian politician

Member of the Manipur Legislative Assembly
- Incumbent
- Assumed office 2017
- Preceded by: Moirangthem Okendro
- Constituency: Heirok

Personal details
- Born: Thokchom Radheshyam Singh
- Party: Bharatiya Janata Party
- Education: PhD, MSw, LLB, BA; Jamia Millia Islamia
- Profession: Retd. IPS officer

Thokchom Radheshyam Singh is an Indian politician from Manipur. He was elected to the Manipur Legislative Assembly from Heirok in the 2017 Manipur Legislative Assembly election as a member of the Bharatiya Janata Party. He was the Minister of Education, Labor & Employment in N. Biren Singh cabinet.

He was re-elected to the Manipur Assembly in 2022 on a BJP ticket for a second consecutive term and later became the Advisor to the Chief Minister of Manipur.

Radheshyam is also a retired IPS officer from Manipur. He received the President’s Police Medal for Gallantry in 2006. He is also a recipient of the President’s Police Medal for Meritorious Service in 2013.

Radheshyam served as the Regional Chief of Human Rights in the United Nations peacekeeping force in Bosnia and Herzegovina in 2000.

He served as the ADC to the Governor of Manipur during 1996-2000.

Radheshyam is an Alumnus of Sainik School, Imphal. He completed his Master Degree (MSw) from Jamia Millia Islamia University. He earned his doctorate in the field of Political Science.

== Career ==
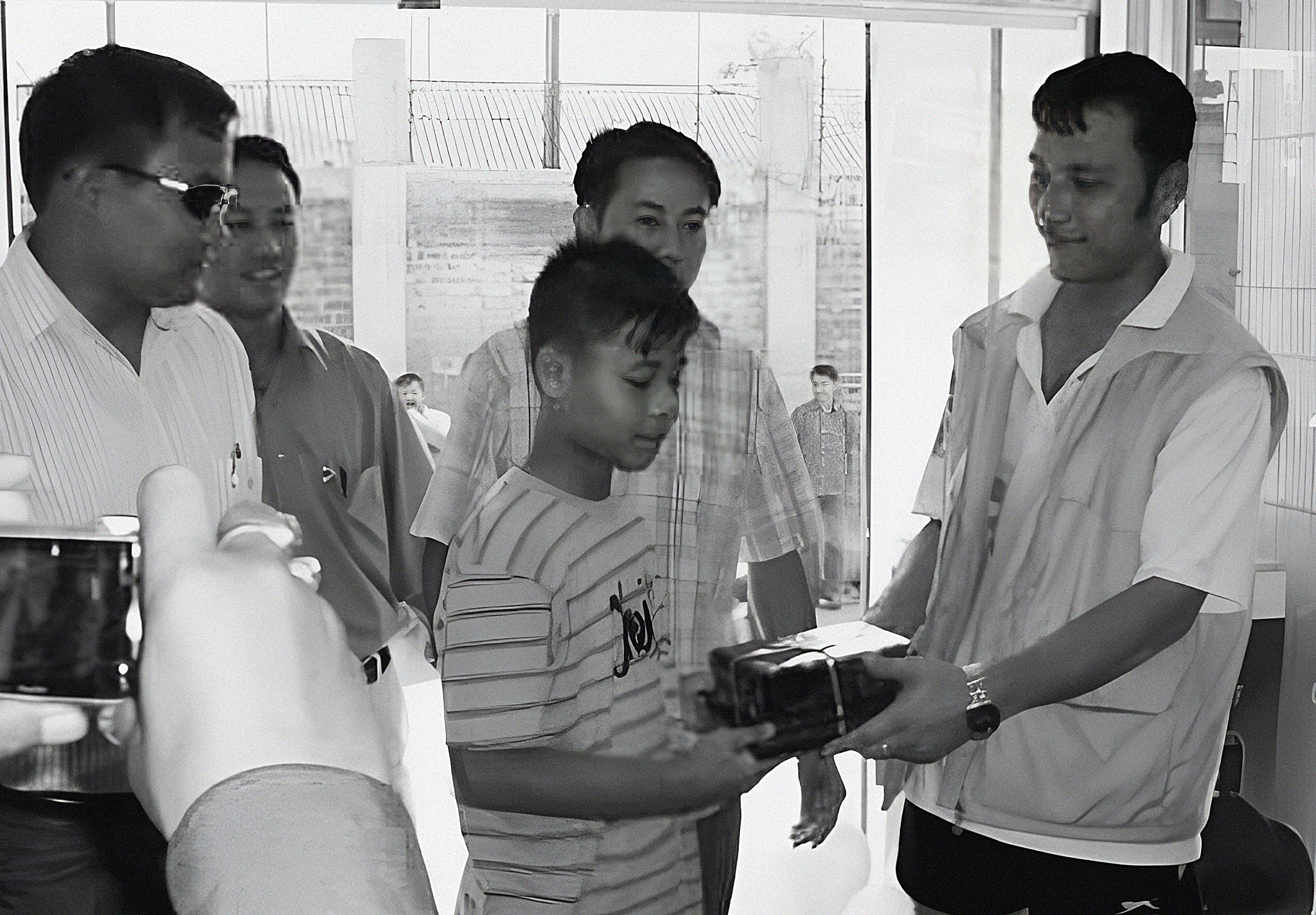
Radheshyam in 2009 presenting an award to Priyakanta Laishram.

In 2017, Dr. Thokchom Radheshyam joined politics by contesting on a BJP ticket and was elected from Heirok Assembly constituency. He defeated Moirangthem Okendro from Indian National Congress, who was the then Education Minister and the President of INC Manipur.

In 2023, he resigned his post as advisor to Manipur's Chief Minister, N. Biren Singh. In his resignation letter, he said he decided to resign as he was not given any responsibility as an advisor.
