= Tadubi Assembly constituency =

Legislative Assembly constituency in Manipur State, India

Coordinates: 25.48°N 94.14°E

Tadubi
- Constituency No. 49 for the Manipur Legislative Assembly

Constituency details
- Country: India
- Region: Northeast India
- State: Manipur
- District: Senapati
- Lok Sabha constituency: Outer Manipur
- Established: 1974
- Total electors: 49,410
- Reservation: ST

Member of Legislative Assembly
- 12th Manipur Legislative Assembly
- Incumbent Vacant

Tadubi Assembly constituency is one of the 60 Legislative Assembly constituencies of Manipur state in India.

It is part of Senapati district and is reserved for candidates belonging to the Scheduled Tribes.

== Members of the Legislative Assembly ==
Year	Member	Party
1974	Saheni Adani	Manipur Hills Union
1980	Luikang	Independent politician
1984	N. G. Luikang	Indian National Congress
1990	N. G. Luikang	Indian National Congress
1995	O. Lohrii	Janata Dal
1998 by-election	Haokholet Kipgen	Federal Party of Manipur
2000	K. Raina	Federal Party of Manipur
2002	Francis Ngajokpa	Indian National Congress
2007	K. Raina	Independent politician
2012	Francis Ngajokpa	Indian National Congress
2017	N. Kayisii	National People's Party
2022	N. Kayisii	National People's Party

== Election results ==
Vote share of winning candidates
2022	47.81%
2017	41.99%
2012	55.43%
2007	35.98%
2002	24.60%
2000	23.78%
1995	36.28%
1990	39.61%
1984	36.52%
1980	32.18%
1974	29.97%

=== 2027 Assembly election ===
2027 Manipur Legislative Assembly election: Tadubi
Party	Candidate	Votes	%	±%
INC				
NDA				
NOTA	None of the above			
Majority				
Turnout				
gain from		Swing		

=== Assembly Election 2022 ===
2022 Manipur Legislative Assembly election: Tadubi
Party	Candidate	Votes	%	±%
NPP	N. Kayisii	21,601	47.81	▲5.82
NPF	M. Francis Ngajokpa	21,052	46.60	▲30.37
Independent	Robert Tailu Maram	2,277	5.04	New
BJP	O. Lohrii	191	0.42	▼38.39
NOTA	None of the Above	58	0.13	▼0.42
Margin of victory		549	1.22	▼1.97
Turnout		45,179	91.44	▲3.95
Registered electors		49,410		▲6.07
NPP hold		Swing	▲5.82	

=== Assembly Election 2017 ===
2017 Manipur Legislative Assembly election: Tadubi
Party	Candidate	Votes	%	±%
NPP	N. Kayisii	17,115	41.99%	New
BJP	M. Francis Ngajokpa	15,816	38.81%	New
NPF	K. Raina	6,614	16.23%	▼20.56
LJP	Dilungheing	354	0.87%	New
Manipur National Democratic Front	L. Hingba Thomas	330	0.81%	New
INC	R. S. Henry Hiilii	305	0.75%	▼54.68
NOTA	None of the Above	223	0.55%	New
Margin of victory		1,299	3.19%	▼15.45
Turnout		40,757	87.49%	▲12.07
Registered electors		46,584		▲8.15
NPP gain from INC		Swing	▼13.43	

=== Assembly Election 2012 ===
2012 Manipur Legislative Assembly election: Tadubi
Party	Candidate	Votes	%	±%
INC	Francis Ngajokpa	18,006	55.43%	▲26.05
NPF	K. Raina	11,951	36.79%	New
AITC	Athikho Solomon Enah	2,529	7.78%	New
Margin of victory		6,055	18.64%	▲17.07
Turnout		32,486	75.42%	▼19.10
Registered electors		43,075		▲3.70
INC gain from Independent		Swing		

=== Assembly Election 2007 ===
2007 Manipur Legislative Assembly election: Tadubi
Party	Candidate	Votes	%	±%
Independent	K. Raina	14,126	35.98%	New
Independent	N. Kayisii	13,512	34.42%	New
INC	Francis Ngajokpa	11,535	29.38%	▲4.78
Margin of victory		614	1.56%	▲0.58
Turnout		39,260	94.52%	▼2.92
Registered electors		41,537		▲13.58
Independent gain from INC		Swing		

=== Assembly Election 2002 ===
2002 Manipur Legislative Assembly election: Tadubi
Party	Candidate	Votes	%	±%
INC	Francis Ngajokpa	8,766	24.60%	▲1.13
BJP	K. Raina	8,416	23.62%	New
SAP	O. Lohrii	5,841	16.39%	▲7.97
FPM	N. Kayaisii	4,897	13.74%	▼10.03
MSCP	David	4,100	11.51%	▼1.40
NCP	N. G. Luikang	3,301	9.26%	New
Margin of victory		350	0.98%	▲0.68
Turnout		35,635	97.44%	▲1.70
Registered electors		36,571		▲5.35
INC gain from FPM		Swing	▲0.82	

=== Assembly Election 2000 ===
2000 Manipur Legislative Assembly election: Tadubi
Party	Candidate	Votes	%	±%
FPM	K. Raina	7,903	23.78%	New
INC	Francis Ngajokpa	7,802	23.47%	New
Independent	Lenkhomang Chongloi	4,933	14.84%	New
Independent	S. Hangzing	4,296	12.92%	New
MSCP	A. Solomon Enah	4,288	12.90%	New
SAP	O. Lohrii	2,798	8.42%	New
RSP	N. Kayisii	1,013	3.05%	New
Margin of victory		101	0.30%	
Turnout		33,238	95.75%	▲95.75
Registered electors		34,715		▲3.92
FPM hold		Swing		

=== Assembly By-election 1998 ===
1998 Manipur Legislative Assembly by-election: Tadubi
Party	Candidate	Votes	%	±%
FPM	Haokholet Kipgen	Unopposed		
Registered electors		33,407		▲6.49
FPM gain from JD		Swing		

=== Assembly Election 1995 ===
1995 Manipur Legislative Assembly election: Tadubi
Party	Candidate	Votes	%	±%
JD	O. Lohrii	10,614	36.28%	▲14.38
IC(S)	S. Hangzing	7,303	24.97%	New
FPM	K. Raina	5,613	19.19%	New
INC	N. G. Luikang	5,382	18.40%	▼21.21
Margin of victory		3,311	11.32%	▲9.31
Turnout		29,252	93.24%	▲2.05
Registered electors		31,372		▲0.79
JD gain from INC		Swing	▼3.32	

=== Assembly Election 1990 ===
1990 Manipur Legislative Assembly election: Tadubi
Party	Candidate	Votes	%	±%
INC	N. G. Luikang	11,244	39.61%	▲3.09
INS(SCS)	S. Hangzing	10,675	37.61%	New
JD	Kholi	6,219	21.91%	New
Margin of victory		569	2.00%	▼2.81
Turnout		28,387	91.20%	▼1.75
Registered electors		31,127		▲29.44
INC hold		Swing		

=== Assembly Election 1984 ===
1984 Manipur Legislative Assembly election: Tadubi
Party	Candidate	Votes	%	±%
INC	N. G. Luikang	8,163	36.52%	New
Independent	Hangzing	7,086	31.70%	New
Independent	Sahani Adani	3,542	15.85%	New
Independent	O. Lohro	3,243	14.51%	New
Margin of victory		1,077	4.82%	▼3.27
Turnout		22,350	92.94%	▲8.80
Registered electors		24,047		▲24.79
INC gain from Independent		Swing	▲4.34	

=== Assembly Election 1980 ===
1980 Manipur Legislative Assembly election: Tadubi
Party	Candidate	Votes	%	±%
Independent	Luikang	5,218	32.18%	New
MPP	Haokholet	3,907	24.10%	New
INC(I)	James Lokho Kolakhe	3,558	21.94%	New
JP	Sahani Adani	3,071	18.94%	New
Margin of victory		1,311	8.09%	▲5.87
Turnout		16,214	84.14%	▲5.24
Registered electors		19,270		▲31.54
Independent gain from Manipur Hills Union		Swing	▲2.21	

=== Assembly Election 1974 ===
1974 Manipur Legislative Assembly election: Tadubi
Party	Candidate	Votes	%	±%
Manipur Hills Union	Saheni Adani	3,464	29.97%	New
KNA	Khupkholam	3,208	27.75%	New
INC	Doiho	2,584	22.35%	New
Independent	Taluba	2,060	17.82%	New
Margin of victory		256	2.21%	
Turnout		11,559	78.90%	
Registered electors		14,650		
Manipur Hills Union win (new seat)				

== See also ==
- List of constituencies of the Manipur Legislative Assembly
- Senapati district
