= Wabgai Assembly constituency =

Legislative Assembly constituency in Manipur State, India

Coordinates: 24.54°N 93.94°E

Wabgai
- Constituency for the Manipur Legislative Assembly

Constituency details
- Country: India
- Region: Northeast India
- State: Manipur
- District: Thoubal
- Lok Sabha constituency: Outer Manipur
- Established: 1974
- Total electors: 31,681
- Reservation: None

Member of Legislative Assembly
- 12th Manipur Legislative Assembly
- Incumbent Usham Deben Singh
- Party: Bharatiya Janata Party
- Elected year: 2022

Wabagai (Vidhan Sabha constituency) is one of the 60 assembly constituencies of Manipur a central Indian state. Wabagai is also part of Outer Manipur Lok Sabha constituency.

== Members of Legislative Assembly ==
- 1974: Habibur Rahaman, Indian National Congress
- 1980: Abdul Salam, Independent
- 1984: Mayengbam Manihar Singh, Independent
- 1990: Mayengbam Manihar Singh,, Indian National Congress
- 1995: Abdul Salam, Manipur Peoples Party
- 2000: Mayengbam Manihar Singh, Indian National Congress
- 2002: Abdul Salam, Indian National Congress
- 2007: Usham Deben Singh, Communist Party of India
- 2012: Fajur Rahim, Indian National Congress

Year	Member	Party
2017	Muhammad Fajur Rahim	Indian National Congress
2022	Usham Deben Singh	Bharatiya Janata Party

== Election results ==
Vote share of winning candidates
2022	31.13%
2017	45.16%
2012	43.75%
2007	30.96%
2002	38.17%
2000	32.61%
1995	38.21%
1990	27.78%
1984	20.82%
1980	21.48%
1974	43.29%

=== 2027 Assembly election ===
2027 Manipur Legislative Assembly election: Wabgai
Party	Candidate	Votes	%	±%
INC				
NDA				
NOTA	None of the above			
Majority				
Turnout				
gain from		Swing		

=== Assembly Election 2022 ===
2022 Manipur Legislative Assembly election: Wabgai
Party	Candidate	Votes	%	±%
BJP	Usham Deben Singh	9,138	31.13%	3.21%
INC	Muhammad Fajur Rahim	9,088	30.96%	−14.20%
NPP	Mayengbam Ranjit Singh	5,873	20.01%	
JD(U)	Md. Sikander	3,601	12.27%	
Independent	Sakir Ahmed	1,501	5.11%	
NOTA	Nota	152	0.52%	
Margin of victory		50	0.17%	−17.07%
Turnout		29,353	92.65%	−0.56%
Registered electors		31,681		6.91%
BJP gain from INC		Swing	-14.03%	

=== Assembly Election 2017 ===
2017 Manipur Legislative Assembly election: Wabgai
Party	Candidate	Votes	%	±%
INC	Muhammad Fajur Rahim	12,474	45.16%	1.41%
BJP	Usham Deben Singh	7,713	27.92%	27.38%
NEIDP	Mayengbam Ranjit Singh	5,264	19.06%	
Manipur National Democratic Front	Md. Abdul Samad	1,695	6.14%	
NPP	Mohammad Habibur Rahman	326	1.18%	
Margin of victory		4,761	17.24%	2.62%
Turnout		27,622	93.21%	0.99%
Registered electors		29,634		19.31%
INC hold		Swing	1.41%	

=== Assembly Election 2012 ===
2012 Manipur Legislative Assembly election: Wabgai
Party	Candidate	Votes	%	±%
INC	Muhammad Fajur Rahim	10,021	43.75%	29.91%
AITC	Usham Deben Singh	6,673	29.13%	
NCP	Mayengbam Manihar Singh	6,085	26.57%	1.97%
BJP	Khomdram Tamphajao Singh	125	0.55%	
Margin of victory		3,348	14.62%	14.26%
Turnout		22,905	92.22%	3.90%
Registered electors		24,837		0.15%
INC gain from CPI		Swing	12.79%	

=== Assembly Election 2007 ===
2007 Manipur Legislative Assembly election: Wabgai
Party	Candidate	Votes	%	±%
CPI	Usham Deben Singh	6,780	30.96%	7.45%
MSCP	Mayengbam Manihar Singh	6,702	30.60%	−7.49%
NCP	Muhammad Fajur Rahim	5,387	24.60%	
INC	Haji Abdul Salam	3,031	13.84%	−24.34%
Margin of victory		78	0.36%	0.27%
Turnout		21,902	88.32%	−5.35%
Registered electors		24,799		17.14%
CPI gain from INC		Swing	-7.22%	

=== Assembly Election 2002 ===
2002 Manipur Legislative Assembly election: Wabgai
Party	Candidate	Votes	%	±%
INC	Md. Abdul Salam	7,512	38.17%	5.57%
MSCP	Mayengbam Manihar Singh	7,496	38.09%	26.62%
CPI	Khomdram Tamphajao Singh	4,626	23.51%	6.50%
Margin of victory		16	0.08%	−11.42%
Turnout		19,678	93.67%	−3.06%
Registered electors		21,170		3.82%
INC hold		Swing	-0.03%	

=== Assembly Election 2000 ===
2000 Manipur Legislative Assembly election: Wabgai
Party	Candidate	Votes	%	±%
INC	Mayengbam Manihar Singh	6,282	32.61%	5.16%
MPP	Md. Abdul Salam	4,066	21.11%	−17.10%
CPI	Khomdram Tamphajao Singh	3,276	17.00%	−1.24%
FPM	Md. Basiruddin	3,125	16.22%	
MSCP	P. Damayenti Devi	2,211	11.48%	
NCP	Md. Yakup Ali	278	1.44%	
Margin of victory		2,216	11.50%	0.74%
Turnout		19,265	94.99%	−1.74%
Registered electors		20,391		10.27%
INC gain from MPP		Swing	-5.60%	

=== Assembly Election 1995 ===
1995 Manipur Legislative Assembly election: Wabgai
Party	Candidate	Votes	%	±%
MPP	Abdul Salam	6,766	38.21%	11.62%
INC	Mayanglambam Manihar Singh	4,861	27.45%	−0.33%
CPI	Khomdram Tamphajao Singh	3,230	18.24%	9.92%
JD	Naorem Mohandas	2,806	15.85%	
Margin of victory		1,905	10.76%	9.57%
Turnout		17,708	96.73%	0.80%
Registered electors		18,492		1.71%
MPP gain from INC		Swing	10.43%	

=== Assembly Election 1990 ===
1990 Manipur Legislative Assembly election: Wabgai
Party	Candidate	Votes	%	±%
INC	Mayengbam Manihar Singh	4,757	27.78%	12.69%
MPP	Abdul Salam	4,553	26.59%	11.26%
JD	Naorem Mohendro	3,992	23.31%	
INS(SCS)	Md. Taher Ali	2,398	14.00%	
CPI	Moirangthem Shajou	1,424	8.32%	
Margin of victory		204	1.19%	0.56%
Turnout		17,124	95.93%	5.93%
Registered electors		18,181		9.10%
INC gain from Independent		Swing	6.96%	

=== Assembly Election 1984 ===
1984 Manipur Legislative Assembly election: Wabgai
Party	Candidate	Votes	%	±%
Independent	Ma Yengbam Manihar	3,046	20.82%	
Independent	Naorem Mohandas	2,954	20.19%	
MPP	Abdul Salam	2,243	15.33%	0.92%
Independent	Md. Taher Ali	2,219	15.17%	
INC	Md. Yakup Ali	2,208	15.09%	
Independent	Moiangthem Sajou Meitei	1,797	12.28%	
JP	M. Bamoranji Singh	162	1.11%	
Margin of victory		92	0.63%	−5.41%
Turnout		14,629	90.00%	5.72%
Registered electors		16,664		12.08%
Independent hold		Swing	-0.66%	

=== Assembly Election 1980 ===
1980 Manipur Legislative Assembly election: Wabgai
Party	Candidate	Votes	%	±%
Independent	Abdul Salam	2,634	21.48%	
Independent	Naorem Mohandas	1,894	15.44%	
MPP	Noirangthem Sajou	1,768	14.42%	−15.95%
JP	Habibur Rahaman	1,596	13.01%	
CPI	Yumnam Gambhir	1,503	12.26%	
INC(I)	Md. Jakup Ali	1,408	11.48%	
Independent	Taher Ali	794	6.47%	
INC(U)	Khuraijam Sajou	666	5.43%	
Margin of victory		740	6.03%	−6.89%
Turnout		12,263	84.27%	2.36%
Registered electors		14,868		20.34%
Independent gain from INC		Swing	-21.82%	

=== Assembly Election 1974 ===
1974 Manipur Legislative Assembly election: Wabgai
Party	Candidate	Votes	%	±%
INC	Habibur Rahaman	4,271	43.29%	
MPP	Naorem Mohandas	2,996	30.37%	
Socialist Party (India)	Tomba	2,270	23.01%	
Independent	Moirangthem Shajou	328	3.32%	
Margin of victory		1,275	12.92%	
Turnout		9,865	81.92%	
Registered electors		12,355		
INC win (new seat)				

== See also ==
- List of constituencies of the Manipur Legislative Assembly
- Wabagai
- Thoubal district
- Outer Manipur (Lok Sabha constituency)
