= T. Thangzalam Haokip =

Indian politician

Telvum Thangzalam Haokip (T.T. Haokip) is an Indian politician and a former member of the Bharatiya Janata Party (BJP). Haokip was elected as a member of the Manipur Legislative Assembly from the Henglep constituency in Churachandpur District as a BJP candidate in 2017. He was the Chairman of the Hill Areas Committee (HAC) from 2017 to 2020. He was the former Deputy Speaker of the 6th Manipur Legislative Assembly. He joined the Indian National Congress in June 2020.

== History ==
- Elected MLA from Henglep constituency, 6th Manipur Legislative Assembly 1998, and Deputy Speaker Manipur Legislative Assembly.
- Elected MLA from Henglep constituency, 11th Manipur Legislative Assembly 2017.
- Chairman, Hill Areas Committee (HAC)
