= Francis Ngajokpa =

Indian politician

Francis Ngajokpa is an Indian politician and member of the Naga People's Front. Ngajokpa was a member of the Manipur Legislative Assembly from the Tadubi constituency in Senapati district from 2002 to 2007 and 2012–2017 as a representative of the Indian National Congress. He served as Minister for education/GAD and RD & PR minister from 2012 to 2016. Francis Ngajokpa left the Congress in 2016 and joined the BJP and in 2021 he left BJP to officially join NPF. He contested the 12th Legislative Assembly election from Tadubi constituency in 2022 and lost.
