= V. Hangkhanlian =

Indian politician

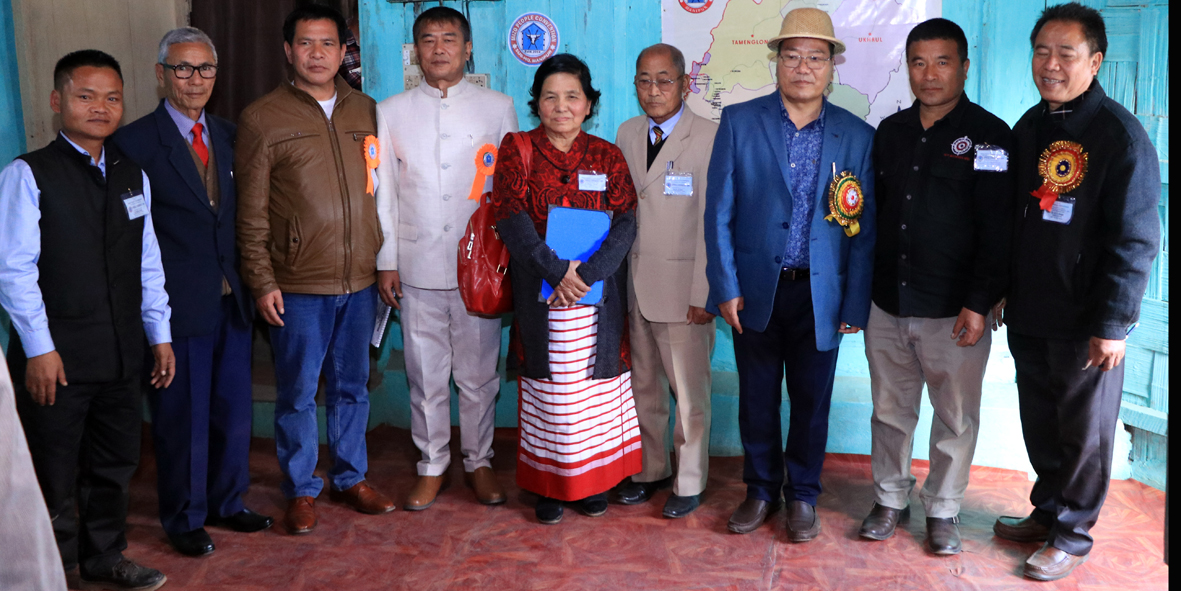
- Inauguration of SEDS society by Manipur Cabinet Minister V. Hangkhanlian

Member of the Manipur Legislative Assembly
- In office 2017–2022
- Preceded by: Tonsing Phungzathang
- Succeeded by: L.M Khaunte
- Constituency: Churachandpur

Personal details
- Born: V. Hangkhanlian
- Party: Bharatiya Janata Party
- Parent: Thuamzaneng (father)
- Education: B.A.
- Alma mater: Lamka College, Manipur University
- Profession: Social Worker

V. Hangkhanlian is an Indian politician. He was elected to the Manipur Legislative Assembly from Churachandpur in the 2017 Manipur Legislative Assembly election as a member of the Bharatiya Janata Party. He was a Minister of Agriculture, Veterinary and Animal Husbandry in N. Biren Singh cabinet from March 2017 to September 2020.
