= Karam Shyam =

Indian politician

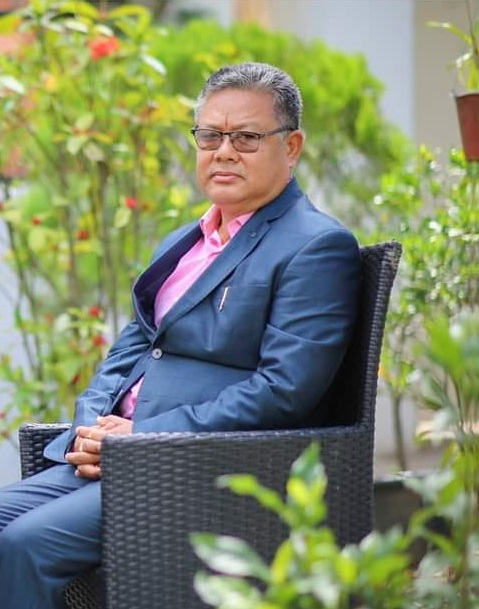

Member of the Manipur Legislative Assembly
- Incumbent
- Assumed office 2012
- Preceded by: O. Joy Singh
- Constituency: Langthabal

Personal details
- Born: 1 March 1962 (age 64)
- Party: Bharatiya Janata Party (2021–present)
- Other political affiliations: Lok Janshakti Party (2007–2021); Democratic Revolutionary Peoples Party (2002–2007)
- Spouse: Karam (O) Thangjam Sharmila Devi
- Children: 3
- Education: Textile Engineering (B.Tech)
- Alma mater: Chhatrapati Shahu Ji Maharaj University (Kanpur University)
- Profession: Politician

Karam Shyam is an Indian politician from Manipur and a member of the Bharatiya Janata Party. He is a member of the Manipur Legislative Assembly from the Langthabal constituency in Imphal West district. He was a cabinet minister in N. Biren Singh's government. He was Minister of Consumer Affairs Food & Public Distribution, weights and measures, revenue, relief and rehabilitation.

Before the 2022 Manipur Legislative Assembly Election, he joined BJP in 2021. Until 2021 he was member of LJP.

Shyam is also a sports enthusiast.
