= Usham Deben Singh =

Indian politician

Usham Deben Singh is an Indian politician and member of the Bharatiya Janata Party. Singh is currently member of the Manipur Legislative Assembly from the Wabgai constituency in Thoubal district from 2022.
