= Phungzathang Tonsing =

Indian politician (1939–2018)

- Tribe: Paite

Personal details
- Born: 14 July 1939 Bungpilon, Thanlon Sub-Division, Churachandpur District, Manipur, India
- Died: 19 December 2018 (aged 79) Apollo Hospital, New Delhi
- Education: Gauhati University

Phungzathang Tonsing was an Indian politician and member of the National People's Party. Tonsing was a member of the Manipur Legislative Assembly from the Churachandpur constituency on an Indian National Congress ticket in Churachandpur district. He was from the Paite tribe. The political positions he held were:

~ 1972 - Elected Member of District Council (MDC) from Ngazam Constituency (unopposed) from Congress (I) ticket. Became Chairman, Autonomous District Council, Churachandpur.

~ 1980 - Elected Member of Legislative Assembly (MLA) from Thanlon Assembly Constituency from Congress (I) ticket. Became Minister of State (MoS) for Medical/Sports/Publicity & Tourism.

~ 1984 - Elected Member of Legislative Assembly (MLA) from Thanlon Assembly Constituency from Congress (I) ticket for the second term. Became Minister of Health & Family Welfare

Established ANM/FHW Training School nearby District Hospital Campus, Churachandpur in 1985.

~ 1990 - Elected Member of Legislative Assembly (MLA) from Thanlon Assembly Constituency from Congress (I) ticket for the third term. Became Minister of Public Health Engineering Department & Tourism.

~ 1995 - Appointed President of Manipur Pradesh Congress Committee (MPCC) during the regime of Shri Narashimha Rao, Hon’ble Prime Minister of India till 1998.

~ 2002 - Elected Member of Legislative Assembly (MLA) from Churachandpur Assembly Constituency from Indian National Congress [INC] ticket. Became Minister of Irrigation & Flood Control Department/Tribal Development & Transport.

~ 2007 - Elected Member of Legislative Assembly (MLA) from Churachandpur Assembly Constituency from Indian National Congress [INC] ticket for the second term in Churachandpur Assembly Constituency. Became Minister of Power/Horticulture & Soil Conservation/Tribal Development & Hills.

~ 2012 - Elected Member of Legislative Assembly (MLA) from Churachandpur Assembly Constituency from Indian National Congress [INC] ticket for the third term in Churachandpur Assembly Constituency. Became Minister of Health & Family Welfare/General Administrative Department/Command Area Development Agency till 2015.

~ He was a Member of All India Congress Committee (AICC) till 2016. He died on 19 December 2018 at Apollo Hospital, New Delhi.
