= Yamthong Haokip =

Indian politician

- Education: BA
- Occupation: Social Worker

Yamthong Haokip is an Indian politician and member of the Bhartiya Janata Party. Haokip was first elected as a member of the Manipur Legislative Assembly from Saikul constituency in Kangpokpi District from the Congress Party in 2012 and re-elected again with the same party ticket in 2017, but switched to the BJP for the 2022 elections.

== History ==
- Elected MLA from 46 Saikul(ST) A/C, 10th Manipur Legislative Assembly 2012
- Elected MLA from 46 Saikul(ST) A/C, 11th Manipur Legislative Assembly 2017
