= 11th Manipur Assembly =

Unicameral state legislature of Manipur in India

Manipur Legislative Assembly
- 11th Legislative Assembly of Manipur

Type
- Type: Unicameral
- Term limits: 5 years

History
- Preceded by: 10th Manipur Legislative Assembly
- Succeeded by: 12th Manipur Legislative Assembly

Leadership
- Speaker: Y. Khemchand Singh, BJP since 20 March 2017
- Deputy Speaker: Kongkham Robindro, BJP since 8 February 2018
- Chief Minister: N Biren Singh, BJP since 15 March 2017
- Deputy Chief Minister: Y Joykumar Singh, NPP since 5 July 2020
- Leader of the Opposition: Okram Ibobi Singh, INC since 15 March 2017

Structure
- Political groups: Government (37): BJP (28); NPF (4); NPP (5); Opposition (13): INC (13); Others (1): JD(U) (1); Vacant (9): Vacant (9)

Elections
- Voting system: First past the post
- Last election: 4 - 8 March 2017
- Next election: 27 February - 3 March 2022

Meeting place
- Manipur Legislative Assembly, Capital Complex, Thangmeiband, Imphal, Manipur, India-795001

Website
- https://manipur.neva.gov.in/

The Manipur Legislative Assembly is the unicameral legislature of the Indian state of Manipur.

== Members of Legislative Assembly ==
No.	Constituency	Name	Party	Alliance	Remarks
1	Khundrakpam	Thokchom Lokeshwar Singh	Indian National Congress	UPA	
2	Heingang	Nongthombam Biren Singh	Bharatiya Janata Party	NDA	
3	Khurai	Leishangthem Susindro Meitei	Bharatiya Janata Party	NDA	
4	Kshetrigao	Nahakpam Indrajit Singh	Bharatiya Janata Party	NDA	
5	Thongju	Thongam Biswajit Singh	Bharatiya Janata Party	NDA	
6	Keirao	Lourembam Rameshwor Meetei	Bharatiya Janata Party	NDA	
7	Andro	Vacant			Disqualification of Thounaojam Shyamkumar Singh
8	Lamlai	Vacant			
9	Thangmeiband	Khumukcham Joykisan Singh	Janata Dal (United)	JD(U)	Switched from INC to JD(U)
10	Uripok	Yumnam Joykumar Singh	National People's Party	NDA	
11	Sagolband	Rajkumar Imo Singh	Bharatiya Janata Party	NDA	Switched from Independent to BJP
12	Keishamthong	Langpoklakpam Jayantakumar Singh	National People's Party	NDA	
13	Singjamei	Yumnam Khemchand Singh	Bharatiya Janata Party	NDA	
14	Yaiskul	Thokchom Satyabrata Singh	Bharatiya Janata Party	NDA	
15	Wangkhei	Yumkham Erabot Singh	National People's Party	NDA	Switched from BJP to NPP
16	Sekmai (SC)	Heikham Dingo Singh	Bharatiya Janata Party	NDA	
17	Lamsang	Sorokhaibam Rajen	Bharatiya Janata Party	NDA	
18	Konthoujam	Dr. Sapam Ranjan Singh	Bharatiya Janata Party	NDA	
19	Patsoi	Akoijam Mirabai Devi	Indian National Congress	UPA	
20	Langthabal	Karam Shyam	Bharatiya Janata Party	NDA	Switched from LJP to BJP
21	Naoriya Pakhanglakpa	Vacant			Resignation by Soibam Subhaschandra Singh
22	Wangoi	Oinam Lukhoi Singh	Bharatiya Janata Party	NDA	Won in 2020 by-poll
23	Mayang Imphal	Kongkham Robindro Singh	Bharatiya Janata Party	NDA	
24	Nambol	Nameirakpam Loken Singh	Indian National Congress	UPA	
25	Oinam	Laishram Radhakishore Singh	Bharatiya Janata Party	NDA	
26	Bishnupur	Vacant			
27	Moirang	Pukhrem Sharatchandra Singh	Indian National Congress	UPA	Switched from BJP to INC
28	Thanga	Tongbram Robindro Singh	Bharatiya Janata Party	NDA	Switched from AITC to BJP
29	Kumbi	Vacant			
30	Lilong	Y. Antas Khan	Bharatiya Janata Party	NDA	Won in 2020 by-poll. Switched from Independent to BJP
31	Thoubal	Okram Ibobi Singh	Indian National Congress	UPA	
32	Wangkhem	Keisham Meghachandra Singh	Indian National Congress	UPA	
33	Heirok	Thokchom Radheshyam Singh	Bharatiya Janata Party	NDA	
34	Wangjing Tentha	Paonam Brojen Singh	Bharatiya Janata Party	NDA	Won in 2020 by-poll
35	Khangabok	Surjakumar Okram	Indian National Congress	UPA	
36	Wabgai	Muhammad Fajur Rahim	Indian National Congress	UPA	
37	Kakching	Mayanglambam Rameswhar Singh	National People's Party	NDA	Switched from BJP to NPP
38	Hiyanglam	Dr. Radheshyam Yumnam	Bharatiya Janata Party	NDA	
39	Sugnu	Kangujam Ranjit Singh	Indian National Congress	UPA	
40	Jiribam	Vacant			Resignation by Ashab Uddin
41	Chandel (ST)	Letpao Haokip	Bharatiya Janata Party	NDA	Switched from NPP to BJP
42	Tengnoupal (ST)	Vacant			Resignation by D. Korungthang
43	Phungyar (ST)	K. Leishiyo	Naga People's Front	NDA	
44	Ukhrul (ST)	Alfred Kan-Ngam Arthur	Indian National Congress	UPA	
45	Chingai (ST)	Khashim Vashum	Naga People's Front	NDA	
46	Saikul (ST)	Yamthong Haokip	Bharatiya Janata Party	NDA	Switched from INC to BJP
47	Karong (ST)	D. D. Thaisii	Indian National Congress	UPA	
48	Mao (ST)	Losii Dikho	Naga People's Front	NDA	
49	Tadubi (ST)	N. Kayisii	National People's Party	NDA	
50	Kangpokpi	Nemcha Kipgen	Bharatiya Janata Party	NDA	
51	Saitu (ST)	Ngamthang Haokip	Bharatiya Janata Party	NDA	Won in 2020 by-poll
52	Tamei (ST)	Awangbow Newmai	Naga People's Front	NDA	
53	Tamenglong (ST)	Vacant			Resignation by Samuel Jendai
54	Nungba (ST)	Gaikhangam Gangmei	Indian National Congress	UPA	
55	Tipaimukh (ST)	Dr. Chaltonlien Amo	Bharatiya Janata Party	NDA	Switched from INC to BJP
56	Thanlon (ST)	Vungzagin Valte	Bharatiya Janata Party	NDA	
57	Henglep (ST)	Vacant			
58	Churachandpur (ST)	V. Hangkhanlian	Bharatiya Janata Party	NDA	
59	Saikot (ST)	T N Haokip	Indian National Congress	UPA	
60	Singhat (ST)	Ginsuanhau Zou	Bharatiya Janata Party	NDA	Won in 2020 by-poll

== See also ==
- Vidhan Sabha
- List of districts of Manipur
- State governments of India
- List of constituencies of the Manipur Legislative Assembly
