= Langpoklakpam Jayantakumar Singh =

Indian politician

Member of the Manipur Legislative Assembly
- In office 2017–2022
- Preceded by: Laisom Ibomcha Singh
- Succeeded by: Sapam Nishikant Singh
- Constituency: Keishamthong

Personal details
- Born: Langpoklakpam Jayantakumar Singh
- Party: National People's Party
- Other political affiliations: Indian National Congress; Federal Party of Manipur
- Parent: L. Bhagyachandra Singh (father)
- Education: M.A., LLB
- Alma mater: Nagpur University
- Profession: Social Worker

Langpoklakpam Jayantakumar Singh (Meitei pronunciation: /lāng-pōk-lāk-pam ja-yant-kū-mār sīng/) is an Indian politician from Manipur. He is the son of former Minister of Education of Manipur: Langpoklakpam Bhagyachandra Singh. He has been elected as the MLA to the Manipur Legislative Assembly from Keishamthong, thrice: in 2000 by-elections from Federal Party of Manipur, 2007 Manipur Legislative Assembly election from Indian National Congress and 2017 Manipur Legislative Assembly election from National People's Party. He was the Minister of Health, Family Welfare, Law and Legislative affairs, Art and Culture in N. Biren Singh's cabinet. He was also the chairman of the Lainingthou Sanamahi Temple Board, the temple development board of Lainingthou Sanamahi of the Sanamahi religion.
