= Nishikant =

Nishikant is a given name. Notable people with the name include:

- Nishikant Dubey (born 1969), Indian politician
- Nishikant Kamat (1970–2020), Indian filmmaker and actor
- Sapam Nishikant Singh (born 1965), Indian politician
