= 2020 Manipur Legislative Assembly by-elections =

November 2020

5 assembly constituencies
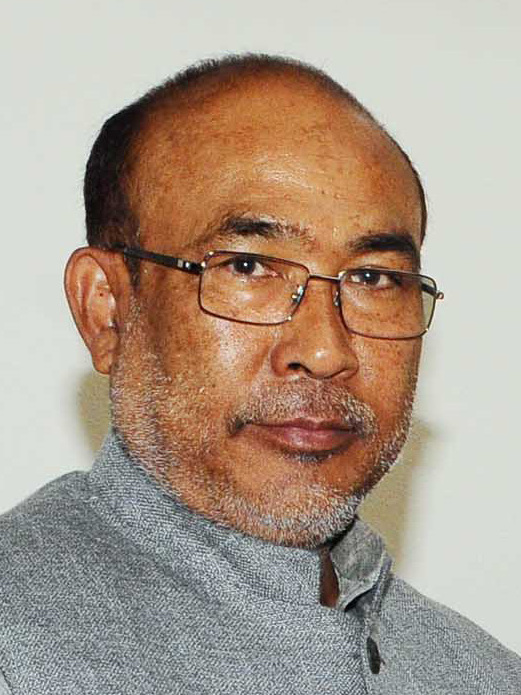
	Majority party	Minority party
Leader	N. Biren Singh	Unknown
Party	BJP	Independents
Alliance	NDA	NDA
Leader's seat	Heingang
Seats won	28	21
Seat change	▲4	▲1
Swing		▲
Chief Minister before election
Nongthombam Biren Singh
Elected Chief Minister
TBD

By-elections for Five state assembly constituencies were held in Manipur on 7 November 2020.

== Background ==
Thirteen seats of the Manipur Legislative Assembly fell vacant after disqualification and mass resignation of Congress MLAs after which thirteen seats fell vacant.

On 10 November 2020, the election of one of these disqualified MLAs (Yengkhom Surchandra Singh, from the Kakching constituency) was declared null and void by the Manipur High Court; as a result, the BJP candidate in that election, who had come in second place, replaced Singh as MLA, so that the number of vacant seats went down to 12.

== Schedule ==
The first phase of the by-elections for 5 constituencies of the Manipur Legislative Assembly has been announced.

Event	Date	Day
Date for Nominations	13 October 2020	Tuesday
Last Date for filing Nominations	20 October 2020	Tuesday
Date for scrutiny of nominations	21 October 2020	Wednesday
Last date for withdrawal of candidatures	23 October 2020	Friday
Date of poll	7 November 2020	Saturday
Date of counting	10 November 2020	Tuesday
Date before which the election shall be completed	12 November 2020	Thursday

== Result ==
S.No	Assembly Constituency		Winner			Runner-up			Margin	Poll On
S.No	No.	Name	Candidate	Party	Votes	Candidate	Party	Votes	Margin	Poll On
1	22	Wangoi	Oinam Lukhoi Singh	Bharatiya Janata Party	10,960	Khuraijam Loken Singh	National People's Party	10,703	257	7 November 2020
2	30	Lilong	Y. Antas Khan	Independent	17,106	Mohd. Abdul Nasir	Independent	14,028	3,078	7 November 2020
3	34	Wangjing Tentha	Paonam Brojen Singh	Bharatiya Janata Party	15,147	Moirangthem Hemanta Singh	Indian National Congress	13,587	1,560	7 November 2020
4	51	Saitu	Ngamthang Haokip	Bharatiya Janata Party	24,549	Lamtinthang Haokip	Indian National Congress	12,292	12,257	7 November 2020
5	60	Singhat	Ginsuanhau Zou	Bharatiya Janata Party	Uncontested					7 November 2020

== See also ==
- 2020 Madhya Pradesh Legislative Assembly by-elections
