= Soraisam Kebi Devi =

Indian politician

Member of the 11th Manipur Assembly
- Incumbent
- Assumed office 2022
- Preceded by: Soibam Subhaschandra Singh
- Constituency: Naoriya Pakhanglakpa

Personal details
- Party: Bhartiya Janta Party
- Occupation: Politician

Soraisam Kebi Devi (born 1990) is an Indian politician from Manipur. She is a member of the Manipur Legislative Assembly representing the Bharatiya Janata Party from Naoriya Pakhanglakpa Assembly constituency in Imphal West district. She won the 2022 Manipur Legislative Assembly election. She is one of the five women who were elected to the 11th Manipur Legislative Assembly.

== Early life and education ==
Kebi Devi is from Imphal. She married Soraisam Gobin Singh. She is a social worker and entrepreneur.

== Career ==
Kebi Devi was first elected as an MLA in 2022, representing Bharatiya Janata Party from Naoriya Pakhanglakpa Assembly constituency in Imphal West district. She won the 2022 Manipur Legislative Assembly election, defeating Soibam Subhaschandra Singh of NPP by a margin of 531 votes.
