= Haokholet Kipgen =

Indian politician

Member of the Manipur Legislative Assembly

Haokholet Kipgen (born 1956) is an Indian politician from Manipur. He is an MLA from Saitu Assembly constituency, which is reserved for Scheduled Tribes, in Kangpokpi District. He won the 2022 Manipur Legislative Assembly election, as an independent politician.

== Early life and education ==
Kipgen is from Hengbung Village, Kangpokpi District, Manipur. He is the son of late Palun Kipgen. He passed Class 10 in 1974 at Motbung High School, Motbung. He engages in orchard farming.

== Career ==
Kipgen won from the Saitu Assembly constituency as an independent politician in the 2022 Manipur Legislative Assembly election. He polled 12,546 votes and defeated his nearest competitor, Ngamthang Haokip of the Bharatiya Janata Party, by a margin of 2,694 votes. He was a former BJP National vice president of ST Morcha but was denied a ticket by the Saffron party and contested as independent and won. He first became an MLA winning the 2000 Manipur Legislative Assembly election. However, he lost the next election in 2002 to Ngamthang Haokip of the Indian National Congress. He regained the Saitu seat in the 2007 Manipur Legislative Assembly election, beating his archrival Haokip, but lost the next three elections in 2012, 2017 and 2020 (by election) to the Congress candidate. The veteran won the 2022 Assembly election as an independent candidate. He is also the only politician to win an assembly seat uncontested in 1998.
