= 10th Manipur Assembly =

Manipur Legislative Assembly

Type
- Type: Unicameral

History
- Preceded by: 9th Manipur Legislative Assembly
- Succeeded by: 11th Manipur Legislative Assembly

Leadership
- Deputy Speaker: TBA, TBA since 2012
- Chief Minister: Okram Ibobi Singh, INC since 2012

Structure
- Seats: 60
- Political groups: Government (50): INC (50); Opposition (5): BJP (1); NPF (4); NCP (0); LJP (0); Vacant/Disqualified (5)

Elections
- Voting system: First-past-the-post
- Last election: 2012

The Manipur Legislative Assembly is the unicameral legislature of the Indian state of Manipur.

== Members of the Manipur Legislative Assembly ==
Current parties in the Manipur Legislative Assembly

- INC (50)
- AITC (0)
- BJP (1)
- NPF (4)
- NCP (0)
- LJP (0)
- Vacant (5)

The following is the list of the members elected in the Manipur assembly:

No.	Constituency	Name of Member	Party
1	Khundrakpam	Thokchom Lokeshwar Singh	INC
2	Heingang	N. Biren	BJP, resigned from Assembly
3	Khurai	Dr. Ng. Bijoy Singh	INC
4	Kshetrigao	Md. Amin Shah	INC
5	Thongju	Thongam Biswajit Singh(elected on AITC ticket, then re-elected on 24 November 2015) and then joined INC	BJP
6	Keirao	Karam Thamarjit Singh	INC(party MSCP merged with INC on 3 April 2014)
7	Andro	Thounaojam Shyamkumar	AITC, joined INC
8	Lamlai	Kshetrimayum Biren Singh	INC
9	Thangmeiband	Khumukcham Joykisan Singh(elected on AITC ticket, then re-elected on 24 November 2015 with the BJP before defecting to the INC on 21 December 2016)	INC
10	Uripok	L. Nandakumar Singh	INC
11	Sagolband	Rajkumar Imo Singh	INC(party MSCP merged with INC on 3 April 2014)
12	Keishamthong	L. Ibomcha Singh	NCP merged with INC
13	Singjamei	Irengbam Hemochandra Singh	INC
14	Yaiskul	Elangbam Chand Singh	INC
15	Wangkhei	Yumkham Erabot Singh	INC defected to BJP, likely to be disqualified
16	Sekmai (SC)	Khwairakpam Devendro Singh	INC
17	Lamsang	Wangkheimayum Brajabidhu Singh	INC
18	Konthoujam	Konthoujam Sharat Singh	AITC, joined INC
19	Patsoi	Akoijam Mirabai Devi	INC
20	Langthabal	Karam Shyam	LJP merged with Indian National Congress
21	Naoriya pakhanglakpa	R.K. Anand	INC
22	Wangoi	Oinam Lukhoi Singh	AITC, joined INC
23	Mayang imphal	Khumujam Ratankumar Singh	INC
24	Nambol	Shri Nameirakpam Loken Singh	INC
25	Oinam	Irengbam Ibohalbi Singh	AITC, joined INC
26	Bishnupur	Konthoujam Govindas	INC
27	Moirang	Mairembam Prithviraj Singh	INC
28	Thanga	Tongbram Mangibabu	INC
29	Kumbi	Sanasam Bira Singh	INC
30	Lilong	Md. Abdul Nasir	INC
31	Thoubal	Okram Ibobi Singh	INC
32	Wangkhem	Keisham Meghachandra Singh	INC
33	Heirok	Moirangthem Okendro	INC
34	Wangjing tentha	Paonam Brojen	INC(party MSCP merged with INC on 3 April 2014)
35	Khangabok	Okram Landhoni Devi	INC
36	Wabgai	Md. Fajur Rahim	INC
37	Kakching	Yengkhom Surchandra Singh	INC
38	Hiyanglam	Maibam Kunjo	AITC, joined INC
39	Sugnu	Kangujam Ranjit Singh	INC
40	Jiribam	Thoudam Debendra Singh	INC
41	Chandel (ST)	St. Nunghlung Victor	NPF
42	Tengnoupal (ST)	D. Korungthang	INC
43	Phungyar (ST)	Victor Keishing	INC
44	Ukhrul (ST)	Samuel Risom	NPF
45	Chingai (ST)	M.K. Preshow	INC
46	Saikul (ST)	Yamthong Haokip	INC
47	Karong (ST)	Dr. V. Alexander Pao	NPF
48	Mao (ST)	Dikho	NPF
49	Tadubi (ST)	Francis Ngajokpa	BJP, resigned from Assembly
50	Kangpokpi	Mrs. Nemcha Kipgen	INC(party MSCP merged with INC on 3 April 2014)
51	Saitu (ST)	Ngamthang Haokip	INC
52	Tamei (ST)	Z.Kikhonbou Newmai	BJP, resigned from Assembly
53	Tamenglong (ST)	Janghemlung Panmei	INC(party MSCP merged with INC on 3 April 2014 & resigned from Assembly)
54	Nungba (ST)	Gaikhangam	INC
55	Tipaimukh (ST)	Dr.Chaltonlien Amo	INC
56	Thanlon (ST)	Vungzagin Valte	INC
57	Henglep (ST)	T.Manga Vaiphei	INC
58	Churachandpur (ST)	Phungzathang Tonsing	INC
59	Saikot (ST)	T N Haokip	INC
60	Singhat (ST)	Ginsuanhau	INC

== See also ==
- Vidhan Sabha
- List of states of India by type of legislature
