= Keishamthong Assembly constituency =

Legislative Assembly constituency in Manipur State, India

Coordinates: 24.79°N 93.93°E

Keishamthong
- Constituency for the Manipur Legislative Assembly
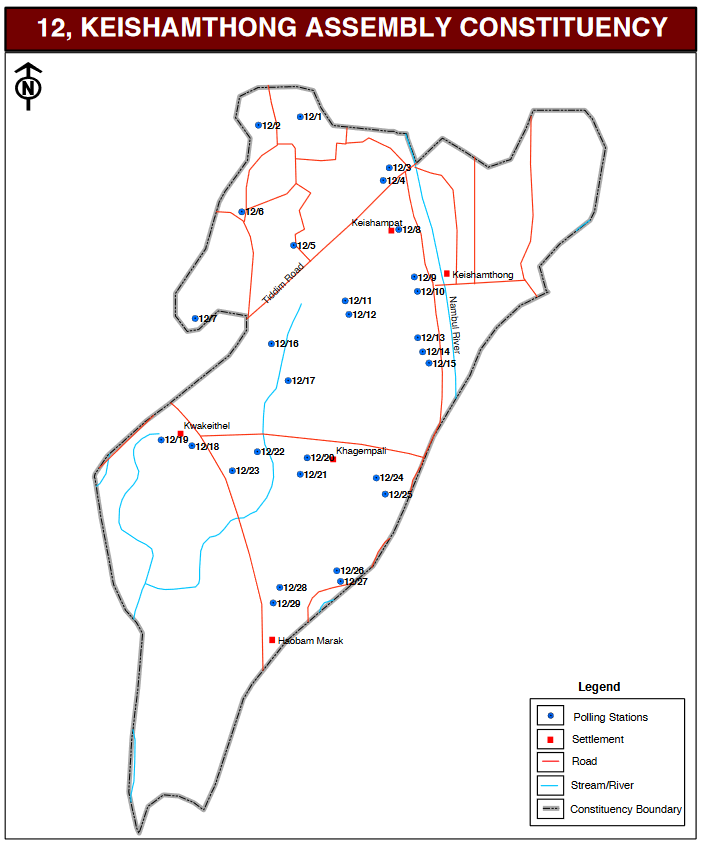

Constituency details
- Country: India
- Region: Northeast India
- State: Manipur
- District: Imphal West
- Lok Sabha constituency: Inner Manipur
- Established: 1967
- Total electors: 27,536
- Reservation: None

Member of Legislative Assembly
- 12th Manipur Legislative Assembly
- Incumbent Sapam Nishikant Singh
- Party: Independent
- Elected year: 2022

Keishamthong (Vidhan Sabha constituency) is one of the 60 assembly constituencies of Manipur, a northeastern state of India.

== Extent ==
Keisamthong is the 12th of 60 constituencies of Manipur. It consists of 40 parts namely: 1 - Kangabam Leikai, 2 - Keishampat Mutum Leikai, 3 - Meisnam Nongthombam Leikai, 4 - Keishampat Thiyam Leikai, 5 - Keishampat Lairembi Lampak, 6 - Keishampat Sega Road, 7 - Keishampat Leimajam Leikai, 8 - Konjeng Hajari Leikai, 9 - Maisnam Nongthombam Leikai, 10 - Khwairakpam Leikai, 11 - Keishamthong Laisom Leirak, 12 - Keishamthong Top Leirak, 13 - Keishamthong Moirangningthou Leirak, 14 - Keishamthong Hodam Leirak (A), 15 - Keishamthong Maning Longjam Leikai, 16 - Keishamthong Hodam Leirak (B), 17 - Elangbam Leikai (A), 18 - Elangbam Leikai Longjam Leirak, 19 - Elangbam Leikai (B), 20 - Elangbam Leikai Leirak Achouba, 21 - Elangbam Leikai (C), 22 - Thouda Bhabok Leikai, 23 - Kwakeithel Nganapi Thong Mapal, 24 - Irom Pukhri Mapal, 25 - Kwakeithel Thokchom Leikai, 26 - Kwakeithel Akham Leikai, 27 - Khagempalli Panthak (A), 28 - Khagempalli Panthak (B), 29 - Keisamthong Thangjam Leirak, 30 - Moirang Purel Leikai (A), 31 - Moirang Purel Leikai (B), 32 - Moirang Purel Leikai (C), 33 - Huidrom Leikai (A), 34 - Huidrom Leikai (B), 35 - Huidrom Leikai (C), 36 - Pishumthong Oinam Leikai (A), 37 - Pishumthong Oinam Leikai (B), 38 - Pishumthong Oinam Leikai (C), 39 - Ngangom Leikai (A), and 40 - Ngangom Leikai (B).

== Members of Legislative Assembly ==
Year	Member	Party
1967	L. Thambou	Indian National Congress
1972	Laishram Manaobi	Independent politician
1974	Raj Kumar Ranbir Singh	Manipur Peoples Party
1980	Laishram Manaobi	Manipur Peoples Party
1984	Laisom Lalit	Asom Gana Parishad
1990	Raj Kumar Ranbir Singh	Manipur Peoples Party
1995	Raj Kumar Ranbir Singh	Manipur Peoples Party
2000	Langpoklakpam Bhagyachandra Singh	Federal Party of Manipur
2002	Laisom Ibomcha Singh	Federal Party of Manipur
2007	Langpoklakpam Jayantakumar Singh	Indian National Congress
2012	Laisom Ibomcha Singh	Nationalist Congress Party
2017	Langpoklakpam Jayantakumar Singh	National People's Party
2022	Sapam Nishikant Singh	Independent politician

== Election results ==
Vote share of winning candidates
2022	35.00%
2017	43.28%
2012	46.75%
2007	50.62%
2002	30.86%
2000	23.90%
1995	55.63%
1990	40.88%
1984	37.40%
1980	15.19%
1974	37.29%
1972	25.30%
1967	33.54%

=== 2027 Assembly election ===
2027 Manipur Legislative Assembly election: Keishamthong
Party	Candidate	Votes	%	±%
INC				
NDA				
NOTA	None of the above			
Majority				
Turnout				
gain from		Swing		

=== 2022 Assembly election ===
2022 Manipur Legislative Assembly election: Keishamthong
Party	Candidate	Votes	%	±%
Independent	Sapam Nishikant Singh	8,874	35.00%	
RPI(A)	Maheshwar Thounaojam	8,687	34.27%	
NPP	Langpoklakpam Jayantakumar Singh	5,760	22.72%	
BJP	Elangbam Samuel Johnson	1,816	7.16%	−14.49%
NOTA	Nota	142	0.56%	−0.33%
Margin of victory		187	0.74%	−13.37%
Turnout		25,352	92.07%	4.85%
Registered electors		27,536		3.93%
Independent gain from NPP		Swing	-8.27%	

=== 2017 Assembly election ===
2017 Manipur Legislative Assembly election: Keishamthong
Party	Candidate	Votes	%	±%
NPP	Langpoklakpam Jayantakumar Singh	10,000	43.28%	
INC	Laisom Ibomcha Singh	6,739	29.16%	−10.62%
BJP	Rajkumar Shivachandra Singh	5,003	21.65%	
NEIDP	Potsangbam Dhanakumar Singh	611	2.64%	
NOTA	None of the Above	206	0.89%	
MPP	Khaba Paonam	204	0.88%	
LJP	Heishnam Lokeshwar Singh	171	0.74%	
Margin of victory		3,261	14.11%	7.15%
Turnout		23,107	87.22%	4.85%
Registered electors		26,494		4.14%
NPP gain from NCP		Swing	-3.47%	

=== 2012 Assembly election ===
2012 Manipur Legislative Assembly election: Keishamthong
Party	Candidate	Votes	%	±%
NCP	Laisom Ibomcha Singh	9,795	46.75%	
INC	Langpoklakpam Jayantakumar Singh	8,336	39.78%	−10.84%
AITC	Rajkumar Shivachandra Singh	2,530	12.07%	
CPI(M)	Yumnam Romola Devi	178	0.85%	
Margin of victory		1,459	6.96%	3.21%
Turnout		20,953	82.35%	−2.97%
Registered electors		25,440		−2.45%
NCP gain from INC		Swing	-3.88%	

=== 2007 Assembly election ===
2007 Manipur Legislative Assembly election: Keishamthong
Party	Candidate	Votes	%	±%
INC	Langpoklakpam Jayantakumar Singh	11,266	50.62%	20.18%
MPP	Laisom Ibomcha Singh	10,431	46.87%	
CPI	Lairenjam Sumatibala	555	2.49%	
Margin of victory		835	3.75%	3.34%
Turnout		22,254	85.34%	−1.90%
Registered electors		26,078		8.34%
INC gain from FPM		Swing	19.77%	

=== 2002 Assembly election ===
2002 Manipur Legislative Assembly election: Keishamthong
Party	Candidate	Votes	%	±%
FPM	Laisom Ibomcha Singh	6,479	30.86%	6.96%
INC	Langpoklakpam Jayantakumar Singh	6,392	30.44%	
DRPP	Potsangbam Kulachandra Singh	3,573	17.02%	
MSCP	Laishram Dev	2,080	9.91%	−6.71%
Manipur National Conference	Elangbam Sunil Singh	2,028	9.66%	
BJP	Thoidingjam Jayanta	446	2.12%	−20.94%
Margin of victory		87	0.41%	−0.42%
Turnout		20,998	87.23%	−1.93%
Registered electors		24,071		7.50%
FPM hold		Swing	-24.78%	

=== 2000 Assembly election ===
2000 Manipur Legislative Assembly election: Keishamthong
Party	Candidate	Votes	%	±%
FPM	L. Bhagyachandra Singh	4,731	23.90%	
BJP	Mayengbam Ibotombi Singh	4,565	23.06%	19.98%
MPP	Rajkumar Ranbir Singh	3,736	18.87%	−36.76%
NCP	L. Dev	3,417	17.26%	
MSCP	L. Lalit Singh	3,290	16.62%	
Margin of victory		166	0.84%	−15.84%
Turnout		19,795	89.40%	0.24%
Registered electors		22,391		8.63%
FPM gain from MPP		Swing	-31.73%	

=== 1995 Assembly election ===
1995 Manipur Legislative Assembly election: Keishamthong
Party	Candidate	Votes	%	±%
MPP	Rajkumar Ranbir Singh	10,091	55.63%	14.75%
INC	Laishrom Lalit Singh	7,066	38.96%	3.49%
BJP	Ahanthem Hemchand	559	3.08%	
JD	Irengbam Jiten	422	2.33%	
Margin of victory		3,025	16.68%	11.26%
Turnout		18,138	89.16%	3.06%
Registered electors		20,613		2.92%
MPP hold		Swing	14.75%	

=== 1990 Assembly election ===
1990 Manipur Legislative Assembly election: Keishamthong
Party	Candidate	Votes	%	±%
MPP	Rajkumar Ranbir Singh	6,987	40.88%	28.04%
INC	Laisom Lalit Singh	6,061	35.46%	−1.94%
INS(SCS)	R. K. Mukhra Devi	2,091	12.23%	
JD	Naoram Khogendra	1,430	8.37%	
CPI	R. K. Sanahal	522	3.05%	
Margin of victory		926	5.42%	0.92%
Turnout		17,091	86.11%	3.51%
Registered electors		20,029		16.52%
MPP gain from INC		Swing	3.48%	

=== 1984 Assembly election ===
1984 Manipur Legislative Assembly election: Keishamthong
Party	Candidate	Votes	%	±%
INC	Laisom Lalit Singh	5,196	37.40%	
JP	Rajkumar Ranbir Singh	4,571	32.90%	
MPP	Lasihram Manobi	1,784	12.84%	−2.35%
Independent	Naoram Khogendra	1,292	9.30%	
Independent	Irengbam Jitendra	542	3.90%	
Independent	Hidangmayum Nabadwip	508	3.66%	
Margin of victory		625	4.50%	1.85%
Turnout		13,893	82.59%	2.47%
Registered electors		17,189		3.55%
INC gain from MPP		Swing	22.21%	

=== 1980 Assembly election ===
1980 Manipur Legislative Assembly election: Keishamthong
Party	Candidate	Votes	%	±%
MPP	Lasihram Manobi	1,998	15.19%	−21.55%
INC(U)	P. Shyamkishore	1,649	12.53%	
CPI	Thokchom Boro	1,647	12.52%	
Independent	E. Dolendra	1,642	12.48%	
JP	Rajkumar Ranbir Singh	1,467	11.15%	
INC(I)	R. K. Mukhra Devi	1,381	10.50%	
JP(S)	Laishram Kullachandra	1,305	9.92%	
Independent	Nageshwar	974	7.40%	
Independent	Naoram Khogendra	781	5.94%	
Independent	I. Jitendra	312	2.37%	
Margin of victory		349	2.65%	2.11%
Turnout		13,156	80.12%	−1.81%
Registered electors		16,600		24.15%
MPP gain from INC		Swing	-22.10%	

=== 1974 Assembly election ===
1974 Manipur Legislative Assembly election: Keishamthong
Party	Candidate	Votes	%	±%
INC	Rajkumar Ranbir Singh	4,033	37.29%	17.02%
MPP	Lasihram Manobi	3,974	36.74%	25.46%
Socialist Labour Party (India)	Laisram Kullachandra Singh	1,941	17.95%	
Independent	Akoijam Nilakamal Singh	868	8.03%	
Margin of victory		59	0.55%	−4.37%
Turnout		10,816	81.93%	4.70%
Registered electors		13,371		24.54%
INC gain from Independent		Swing	11.99%	

=== 1972 Assembly election ===
1972 Manipur Legislative Assembly election: Keishamthong
Party	Candidate	Votes	%	±%
Independent	Lasihram Manobi	2,066	25.30%	
Independent	L. Bhagyachandra Singh	1,665	20.39%	
INC	Thiyam Mukhra	1,655	20.27%	−13.28%
Socialist Labour Party (India)	Kulachandra Singh	1,155	14.14%	
MPP	Lasihram Manobi	921	11.28%	
CPI	R. K. Sanahal	704	8.62%	
Margin of victory		401	4.91%	3.54%
Turnout		8,166	77.24%	−2.01%
Registered electors		10,736		−38.17%
Independent gain from INC		Swing	-8.24%	

=== 1967 Assembly election ===
1967 Manipur Legislative Assembly election: Keishamthong
Party	Candidate	Votes	%	±%
INC	L. Thambou	4,488	33.54%	
Independent	L. Manaobi	4,305	32.17%	
Independent	L. Kullachandra	3,477	25.99%	
Independent	R. K. Manisana	946	7.07%	
Independent	S. Tolemnacha	164	1.23%	
Margin of victory		183	1.37%	
Turnout		13,380	79.25%	
Registered electors		17,363		
INC win (new seat)				

== See also ==
- List of constituencies of Manipur Legislative Assembly
- Imphal West district
