= Muhammad Abdul Nasir =

Indian politician

Member of the Manipur Legislative Assembly
- Incumbent
- Assumed office 10 March 2022
- Preceded by: Y. Antas Khan
- Constituency: Lilong
- In office 2012–2020
- Preceded by: Muhammad Helaluddin Khan
- Succeeded by: Y. Antas Khan

Personal details
- Party: Janata Dal (United)
- Other political affiliations: Indian National Congress

Muhammad Abdul Nasir is an Indian politician and former member of the Manipur Legislative Assembly representing Lilong. He had served as the Minister of Agriculture in the Okram Ibobi Singh cabinet.

== Political career ==
Nasir was elected to the Manipur Legislative Assembly in 2017 from Lilong as a candidate of the Indian National Congress. In 2018, he faced difficulty with constructing his house in Nagaram village where the local tribal people do not sell land to outsiders and wanted to halt the construction of his house.

Nasir resigned in 2020 along with five other politicians of Indian National Congress. He defected to Janata Dal (United).

He won the 2022 Manipur Legislative Assembly election from Lilong.
