= Sapam Kunjakeswor Singh =

Indian politician (1959–2026)

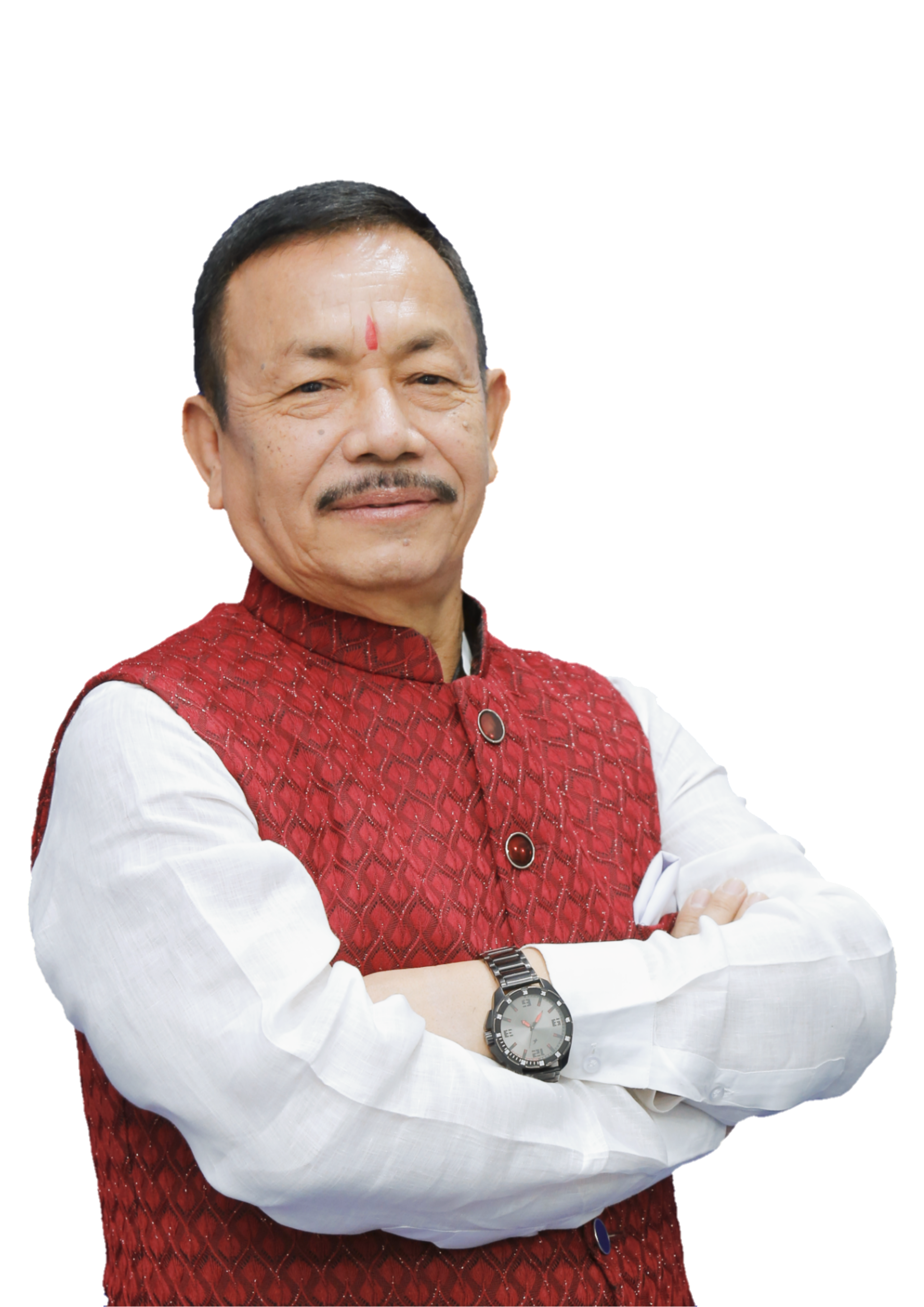

Chairman, MEDCO
- In office 2022–2026
- Preceded by: Yumnam Radheshyam Singh

Member of the Manipur Legislative Assembly
- In office 2022–2026
- Preceded by: Akoijam Mirabai Devi
- Constituency: Patsoi
- In office 2007–2012
- Preceded by: Moirangthem Nabadwip
- Succeeded by: Akoijam Mirabai Devi
- Constituency: Patsoi

Personal details
- Born: 1 January 1959 Imphal, Manipur, India
- Died: 20 November 2026 (aged 67) Delhi, India
- Party: Bharatiya Janata Party (2013–2017) (2021–2026)
- Other political affiliations: Independent (2007–2012); AITC (2012–2013); NEIDP (2017–2021)
- Spouse: Ningolei Devi
- Parent: Ibochouba Singh (father)
- Education: DM College of Science, Manipur
- Occupation: Social worker

Sapam Kunjakeswor Singh (1 January 1959 – 20 November 2026), also known as Sapam Keba, was a politician from the Indian state of Manipur. He was representing Patsoi Assembly Constituency in the 12th Manipur Legislative Assembly. He also represented the Patsoi assembly constituency during 2007–2012 in the 9th Manipur Legislative Assembly.

In 2007, he won his maiden election as an independent candidate by defeating the former Deputy Chief Minister and also the former Speaker L. Chandramani Singh by a margin of 1644 votes. He lost the 2012 election as an All India Trinamool Congress candidate. In 2017, he joined the North East India Development Party (NEIDP). He lost the 2017 election by a slim margin of only 114 votes against a sitting Indian National Congress Minister. In the 2022 state Assembly election, as a BJP candidate he defeated the former INC Minister AK. Mirabai Devi. On 15 June 2022, Sapam Keba was appointed the Chairman of MEDCO (Manipur Electronics Development Corporation Limited).

Singh died on 20 November 2026, at the age of 67.

== Early life and education ==
Sapam Keba was born in Imphal, Manipur. A Bachelor of Science graduate from DM college of Science, Manipur. Earlier in his career, he worked as a Demonstrator in the Department of Chemistry in Oriental College, Imphal.

== Political career ==
In the early 2000s, Sapam Keba and his team founded a political organisation called Progressive Committee Patsoi Kendra. The goal of this organisation was to help augment the overall development of Patsoi assembly constituency.

=== 2002 ===
In the 2002 assembly election, this very organisation backed the CPI candidate Moirangthem Nabadwip Singh and eventually Moirangthem Nabadwip Singh won the Patsoi seat.

Manipur Legislative Assembly Election, 2002: Patsoi
Party	Candidate	Votes	%	±%
CPI	Moirangthem Nabadwip	8,622		
FPM	Leishangthem Chandramani Singh	7700		
INC	Akoijam Mirabai Devi	4333		
DRPP	Sapam Samugnou Singh	670		
NCP	Atom Tondon	423		
JD(U)	Shamulailatpam Kameshor	52		
Majority				
Turnout				

=== 2007 ===
Clarion call from the supporters of Sapam Keba of actual contesting the election grew louder and stronger in the run-up to the 2007 assembly election. After much thought and deliberations, Sapam Keba took the plunge and announced his candidature for the 2007 Assembly Election. He took an independent stand and stood as an Independent candidate. Amongst the candidates included the veteran politician, former Speaker and also the former Deputy Chief Minister Dr. L.Chandramani Singh and others. He won the election by a margin of 1644 votes and was termed as a "Giant Killer" by the local media.

Manipur Legislative Assembly Election, 2007: Patsoi
Party	Candidate	Votes	%	±%
Independent	Sapam Kunjakeswor Singh	8,936		
MPP	Leishangthem Chandramani Singh	7292		
INC	Akoijam Mirabai Devi	7196		
CPI	Moirangthem Nabadwip	2348		
SP	Atom Tondon Singh	136		
LJP	Sapam Samugnou Singh	122		
RJD	Sapam Ibohal Singh	103		
Majority				
Turnout				

Upon becoming the MLA as an independent candidate, the political force of Sapam Keba was not the strongest as the Government led by O. Ibobi Singh of the INC was in a comfortable majority with its allies. Since in the Centre, there was also the Congress-led UPA Government, the levers of power and patronage were in the hands of Congress politicians whether elected or otherwise. Projects proposed by Sapam Keba were put in the back burner and there was little to no support whatsoever from the ruling dispensation. On top of all that, the state machineries were in a constant hostile mode with Sapam Keba. Despite this, Sapam Keba performed admirably and the period of 2007-2012 saw a steady progress in the development of Patsoi Assembly Constituency.

=== 2012 ===
The context of this 2012 election is based on the above facts among other factors. The other factors include, the strong wave of Congress in the state and Sapam Keba for this 2012 election was contesting against the Congress on AITC ticket. The number of votes Sapam Keba got in 2007 is almost the same as he got in 2012 implying that the people who voted for him in 2007 still trusted him in 2012 also. Another factor includes the anti-Sapam Keba votes combining and this posed a significant threat to Sapam Keba. The anti-Sapam Keba votes include the Communist votes as well as the votes from the Former Speaker L. Chandramani Singh who got more than 7000 votes in 2007 but was reduced to 2515 votes in the 2012 election. All these factors led to the defeat of Sapam Keba.

Manipur Legislative Assembly Election, 2012:Patsoi
Party	Candidate	Votes	%	±%
INC	Akoijam Mirabai Devi	14,257		
AITC	Sapam Kunjakeswor Singh	8,710		
MPP	L. Chandramani Singh	2515		
CPI	Pheiroijam Irabot Singh	1482		
SS	Sapam Samungou Singh	113		

After the defeat in the 2012 Election, Sapam Keba began looking for alternate political options since the AITC did not perform as well as people hoped for. In this period, BJP began their rise in the narrative of the country. In December 2013 Sapam Keba joined BJP in the presence of Tapir Gao, Former MP from Arunachal Pradesh and in-charge of BJP Manipur and under the state BJP Presidency of Th. Chaoba Singh, Former Union Minister. The joining of Sapam Keba to the BJP was before Narendra Modi became the official Prime Ministerial candidate of the BJP and at a time when not many in Manipur were enthusiastic about joining the BJP.

After joining the BJP, Sapam Keba was appointed one of the executive members of BJP Manipur Pradesh and later on was inducted as one of the core-committee members.

=== 2017 ===
Despite working judiciously for the BJP and even upon repeated assurances from the State BJP leadership that the BJP ticket would be decided on the winnability factor, Sapam Keba's name was overlooked for the nomination. Sapam Keba joined the regional party NEIDP and fought the 2017 state assembly election however lost the election by a slimmest of margin of only 114 votes against the incumbent Indian National Congress Minister Ak. Mirabai. The BJP candidate secured only 3,173 votes and lost his deposit.

Manipur Legislative Assembly Election, 2017:Patsoi
Party	Candidate	Votes	%	±%
INC	Akoijam Mirabai Devi	13,405		
NEIDP	Sapam Kunjakeswor Singh	13,291		
BJP	S. Premananda Sharma	3,173		
NPP	Chungkham Thoiba (Bijoy) Singh	1,236		
CPI(M)	Thounaojam Sharat Singh	85		

=== 2022 ===
On 15 July 2021, Sapam Keba quit NEIDP. On 24 October 2021 Sapam Keba rejoined BJP in presence of Chief Minister of Manipur N. Biren Singh and BJP State President A. Sharda Devi. The announcement of BJP candidate list for the 2022 state assembly election included Sapam Keba and he contested the election on the BJP ticket. In the tricornered fight of Patsoi AC between BJP, Congress and NPP, Sapam Keba of BJP emerged victorious. The BJP as a whole also performed exceptionally well in the state by winning the majority 32 seats out of 60 seats and forming the Government in the state.

Manipur Legislative Assembly Election, 2022:Patsoi
Party	Candidate	Votes	%	±%
BJP	Sapam Kunjakeswor Singh	12,186		
INC	Akoijam Mirabai Devi	11,499		
NPP	R.K. Rameshwar Singh	10,741		
JD(U)	Wakambam Ibomcha Singh	125		
NOTA		285		

== Positions held in political parties ==
- Core-committee member - BJP Manipur Pradesh
- Interim President - NEIDP

== Photo gallery ==
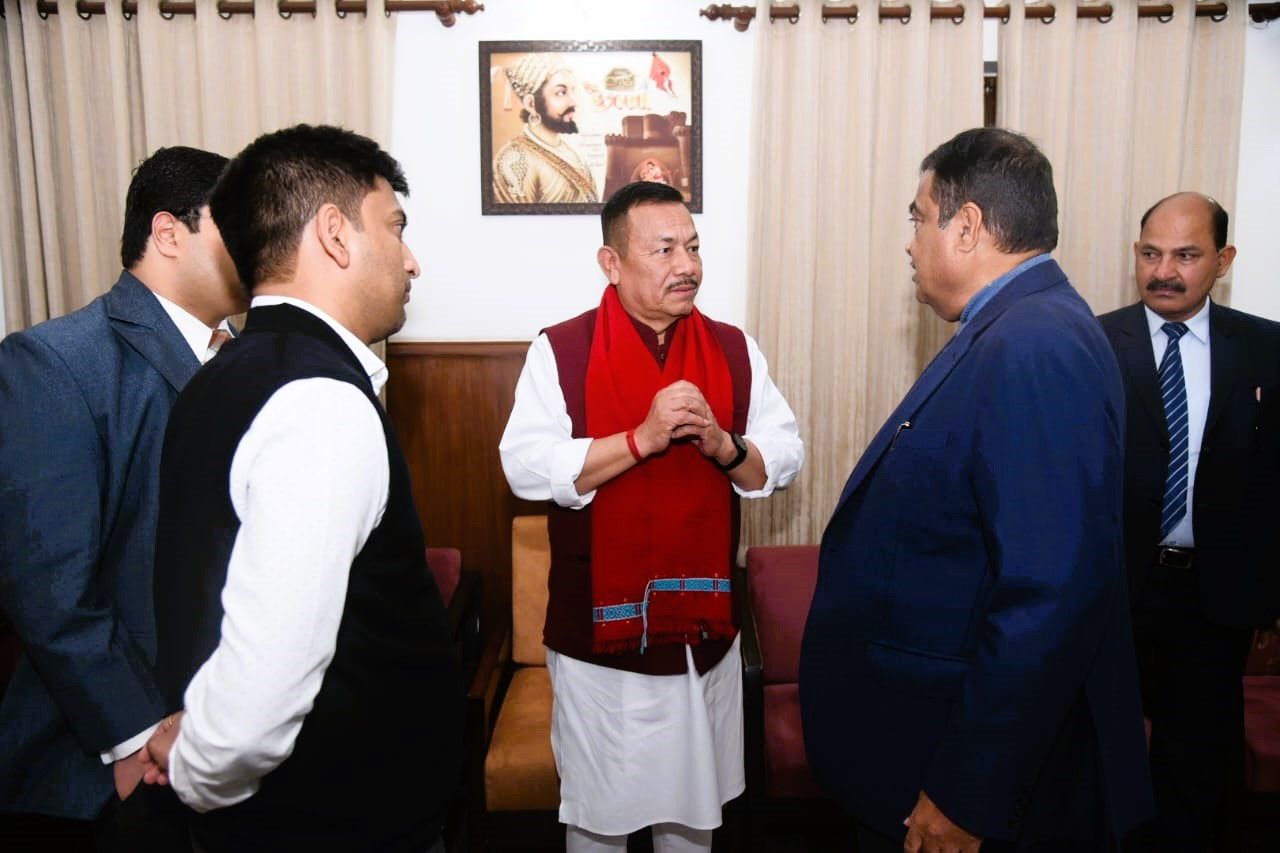
Meeting Union Minister of Road Transport and Highways Nitin Gadkari in Delhi

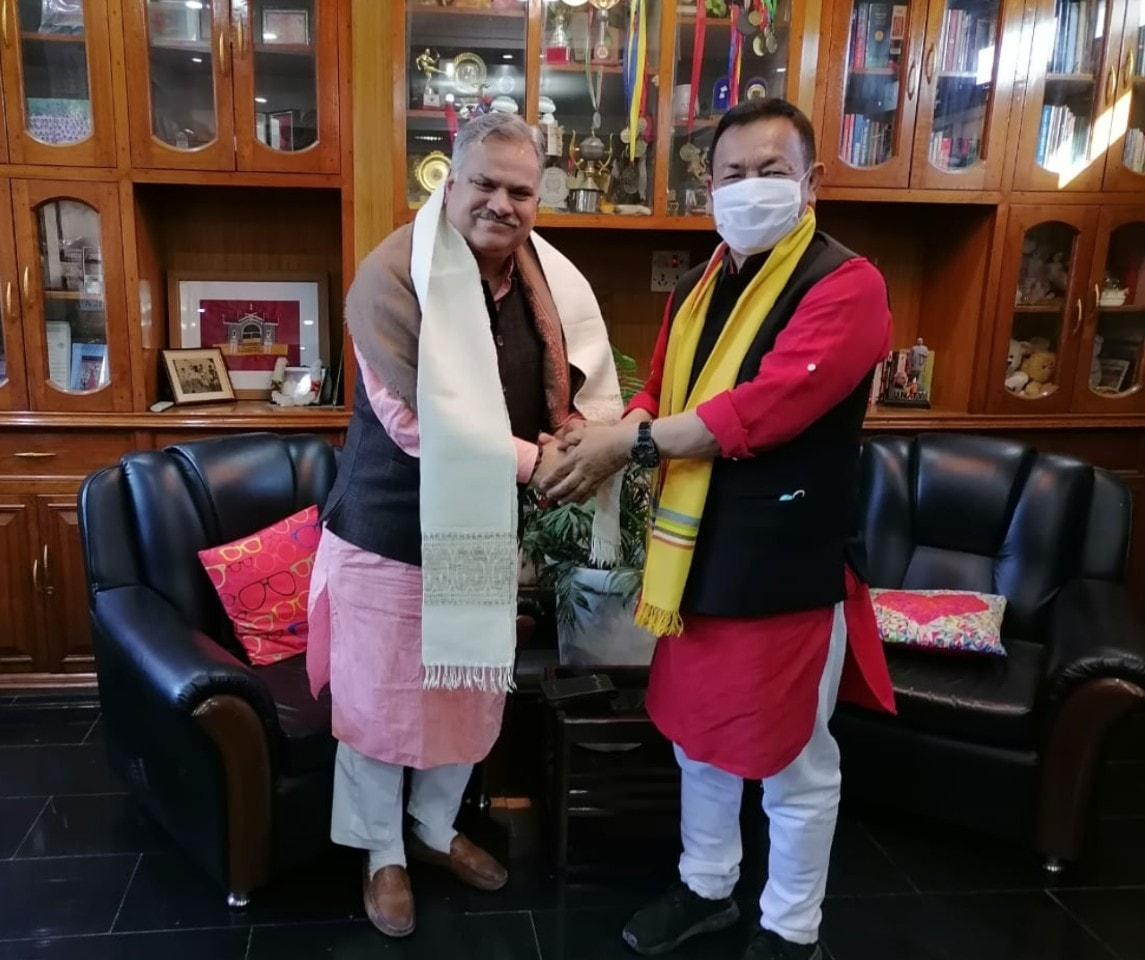
Courtesy call by BJP General Secretary Ajay Jamwal at the residence of Sapam Keba

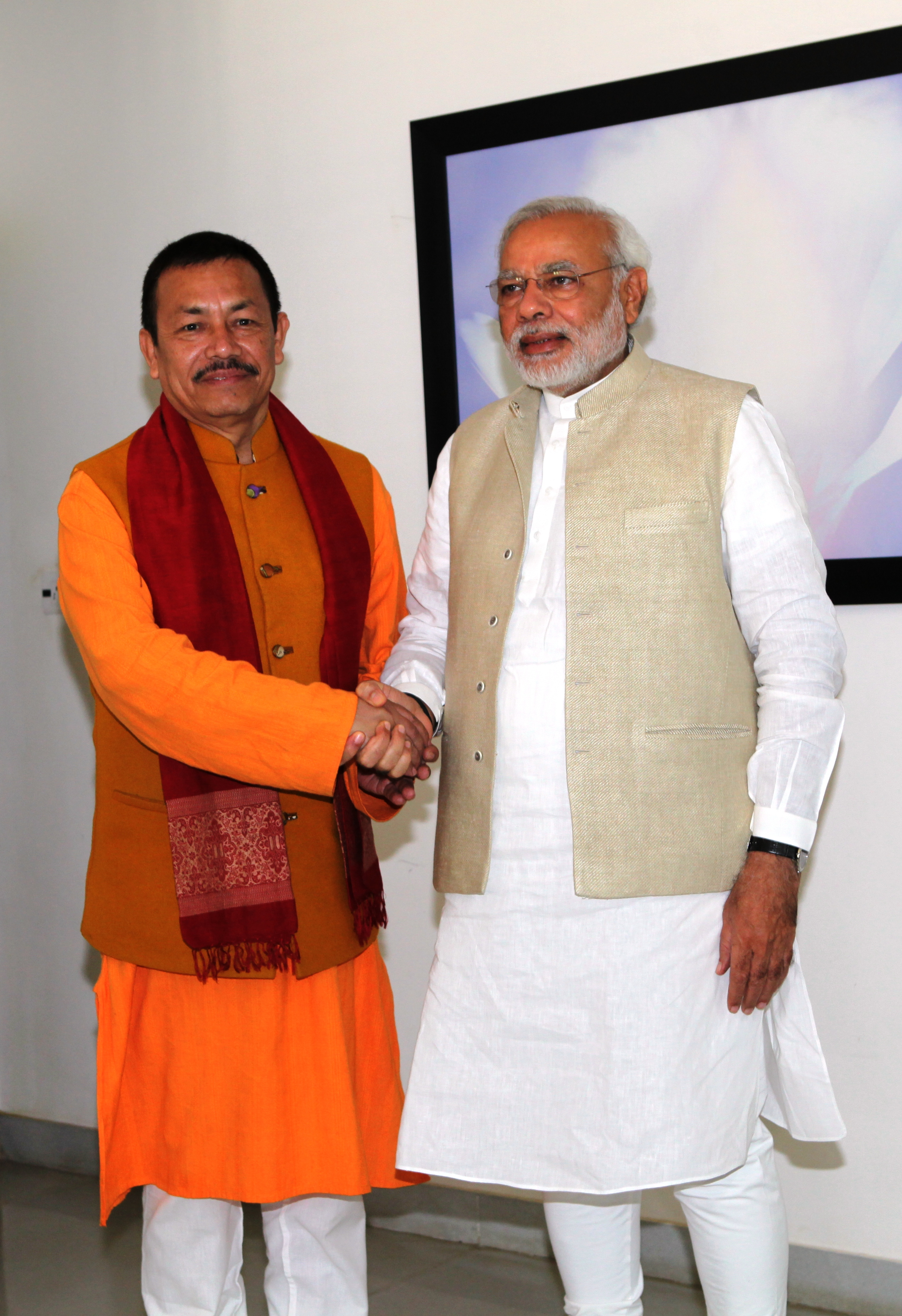
Sapam Keba and Narendra Modi in Gujarat, 6 January 2014

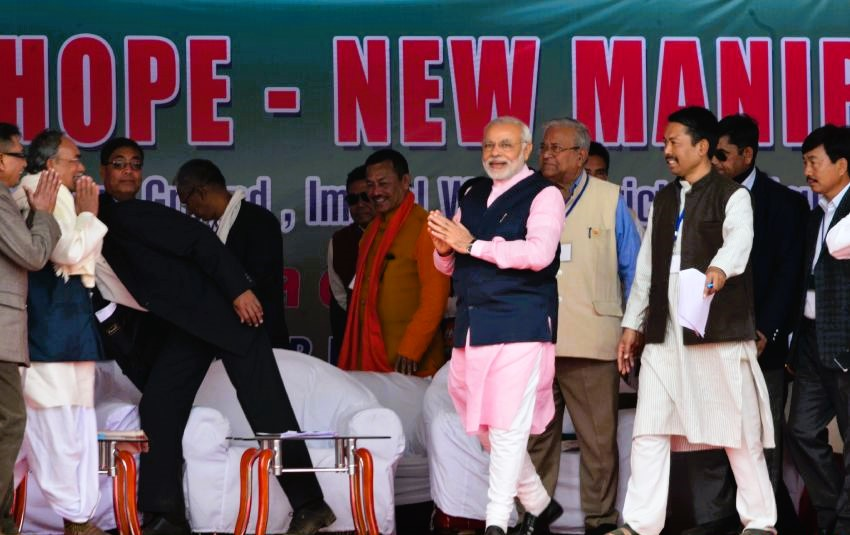
Sapam Keba with Narendra Modi in Imphal on stage on 8 February 2014

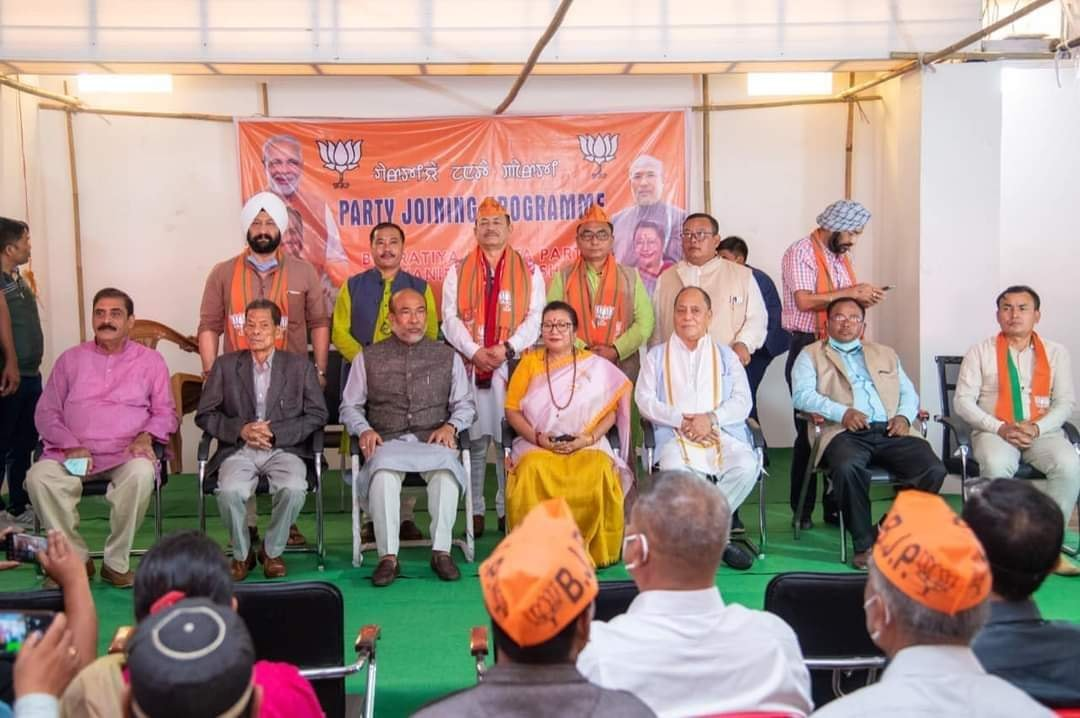
Sapam Keba rejoins BJP on 24 October 2021
