= Patsoi Assembly constituency =

Legislative Assembly constituency in Manipur State, India

Coordinates: 24.79°N 93.88°E

Patsoi
- Constituency No. 19 for the Manipur Legislative Assembly
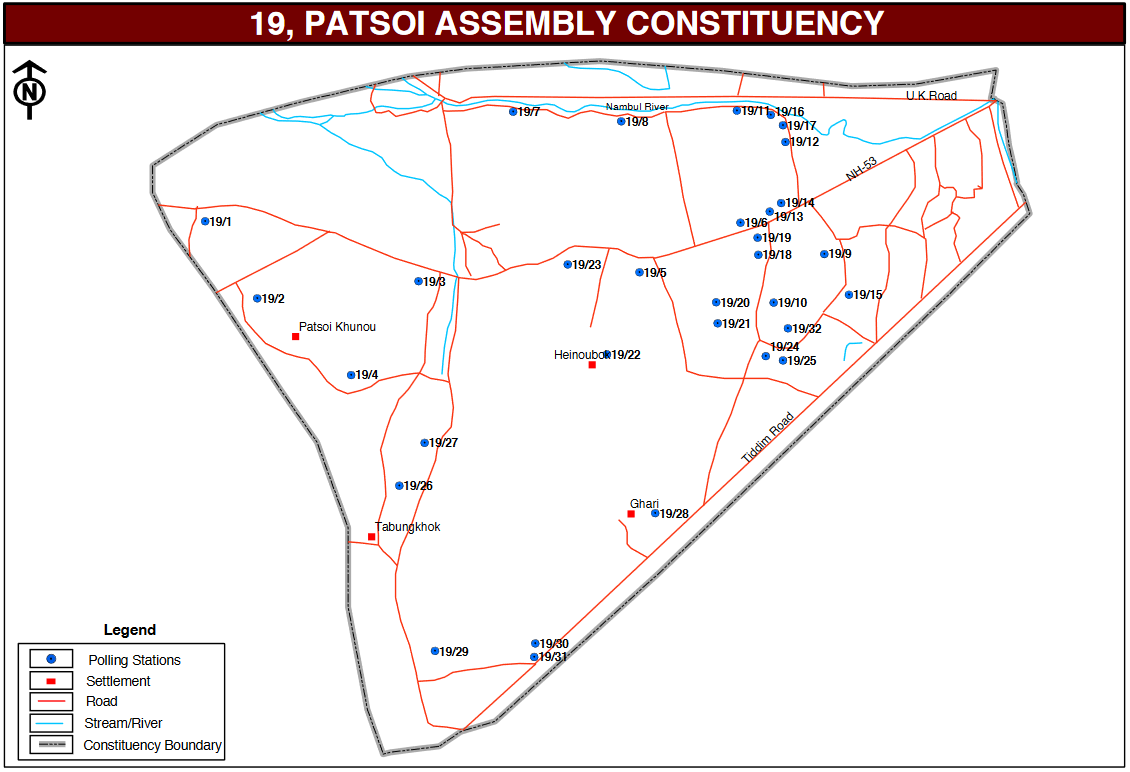

Constituency details
- Country: India
- Region: Northeast India
- State: Manipur
- District: Imphal West
- Lok Sabha constituency: Inner Manipur
- Established: 1972
- Total electors: 37,604
- Reservation: None

Member of Legislative Assembly
- 12th Manipur Legislative Assembly
- Incumbent Vacant (since 20 November 2026)
- Party: BJP
- Elected year: 2022

Patsoi Legislative Assembly constituency is one of the 60 Legislative Assembly constituencies of Manipur state in India.

It is part of Imphal West district.

== Extent ==
Patsoi is the 19th among 80 constituencies of Manipur. It consists of 49 parts namely: 1 - Patsoi Part-VI, 2 - Patsoi Part-III, 3 - Patsoi Part-I, 4 - Patsoi Part-II (A), 5 - Patsoi Part-II (B), 6 - Takyel Kolom Leikai (A), 7 - Takyel Kolom Leikai (B), 8 - Moirang Hanuba Maning, 9 - Moirang Hanuba Mamang, 10 - Takyel Khongbal (A), 11 - Takyel Khongbal (B), 12 - Khumanthem Leikai (A), 13 - Khumanthem Leikai (B), 14 - Sagolband Sapam Leirak (A), 15 - Sagolband Sapam Leirak (B), 16 - Loukrakpam Leikai (A), 17 - Loukrakpam Leikai (B), 18 - Lamjaotongba (A), 19 - Lamjaotongba (B), 20 - Sapam Leirak (A), 21 - Sapam Leirak (B), 22 - Bijoy Govinda (A), 23 - Bijoy Govinda (B), 24 - Loukham Leirak (A), 25 - Loukham Leirak (B), 26 - Lamjaotongba (C), 27 - Lukram Leirak Machin, 28 - Lukram Leirak, 29 - Lamjaotongba (D), 30 - Heinoupok (A), 31 - Heinoupok (B), 32 - Langjing Achouba (A), 33 - Langjing Achouba (B), 34 - Sangaiprou (A), 35 - Sangaiprou (B), 36 - Kwakeithel Thounaojam leikai, 37 - Sangaiprou (C), 38 - Sadokpam Leikai, 39 - Tabungkhok Makha Leikai (A), 40 - Tabungkhok Makha Leikai (B), 41 - Tabungkhok Mayai Leikai, 42 - Ghari, 43 - Ghari Makha Leikai, 44 - Changangei Kabui Khul (A), 45 - Changangei Kabui Khul (B), 46 - Changangei Uchekon, 47 - Changangei, 48 - Konthoujam Leikai, and 49 - Mayaikoibi Chabungbam Leikai.

== Members of the Legislative Assembly ==
Year	Member	Party
1972	Dr. Leishangthem Chandramani Singh	Independent politician
1974	Dr. Leishangthem Chandramani Singh	Manipur Peoples Party
1980	Dr. Leishangthem Chandramani Singh	Janata Party
1984	Dr. Leishangthem Chandramani Singh	Indian National Congress
1990	N. Ibomcha	Indian Congress (Socialist) – Sarat Chandra Sinha
1995	Dr. Leishangthem Chandramani Singh	Indian National Congress
2000	Dr. Leishangthem Chandramani Singh	Manipur State Congress Party
2002	Moirangthem Nabadwip	Communist Party of India
2007	Sapam Kunjakeswor Singh	Independent
2012	Akoijam Mirabai Devi	Indian National Congress
2017	Akoijam Mirabai Devi	Indian National Congress
2022	Sapam Kunjakeswor Singh	BJP

== Election results ==
Vote share of winning candidates
2022	34.98%
2017	42.61%
2012	52.63%
2007	34.18%
2002	39.55%
2000	38.54%
1995	29.33%
1990	49.83%
1984	29.06%
1980	26.48%
1974	46.09%
1972	43.46%

=== 2027 Assembly election ===
2027 Manipur Legislative Assembly election: Patsoi
Party	Candidate	Votes	%	±%
INC				
NDA				
NOTA	None of the above			
Majority				
Turnout				
gain from		Swing		

=== Assembly Election 2022 ===
2022 Manipur Legislative Assembly election: Patsoi
Party	Candidate	Votes	%	±%
BJP	Sapam Kunjakeswor Singh	12,186	34.98%	24.90%
INC	Akoijam Mirabai Devi	11,499	33.01%	−9.60%
NPP	R. K. Rameshwar Singh	10,741	30.83%	
NOTA	Nota	285	0.82%	−0.04%
Margin of victory		687	1.97%	1.61%
Turnout		34,836	92.64%	2.54%
Registered electors		37,604		7.70%
BJP gain from INC		Swing	-7.63%	

=== Assembly Election 2017 ===
2017 Manipur Legislative Assembly election: Patsoi
Party	Candidate	Votes	%	±%
INC	Akoijam Mirabai Devi	13,405	42.61%	−10.02%
NEIDP	Sapam Kunjakeswor Singh	13,291	42.25%	
BJP	S. Premananda Sharma	3,173	10.09%	
NPP	Chungkham Thoiba (Bijoy) Singh	1,236	3.93%	
NOTA	None of the Above	270	0.86%	
Margin of victory		114	0.36%	−20.12%
Turnout		31,460	90.10%	3.38%
Registered electors		34,916		11.78%
INC hold		Swing	-10.02%	

=== Assembly Election 2012 ===
2012 Manipur Legislative Assembly election: Patsoi
Party	Candidate	Votes	%	±%
INC	Akoijam Mirabai Devi	14,257	52.63%	25.10%
AITC	Sapam Kunjakeswor Singh	8,710	32.15%	
MPP	Dr. Leishangthem Chandramani Singh	2,515	9.28%	−18.61%
CPI	Pheiroijam Irabot Singh	1,482	5.47%	−3.51%
Margin of victory		5,547	20.48%	14.19%
Turnout		27,088	86.69%	−2.86%
Registered electors		31,235		7.04%
INC gain from Independent		Swing	18.45%	

=== Assembly Election 2007 ===
2007 Manipur Legislative Assembly election: Patsoi
Party	Candidate	Votes	%	±%
Independent	Sapam Kunjakeswor Singh	8,936	34.18%	
MPP	Dr. Leishangthem Chandramani Singh	7,292	27.89%	
INC	Akoijam Mirabai Devi	7,196	27.53%	7.65%
CPI	Moirangthem Nabadwip	2,348	8.98%	−30.57%
SP	Atom Tondon Singh	136	0.52%	
Margin of victory		1,644	6.29%	2.06%
Turnout		26,141	89.58%	1.63%
Registered electors		29,182		16.91%
Independent gain from CPI		Swing	-5.37%	

=== Assembly Election 2002 ===
2002 Manipur Legislative Assembly election: Patsoi
Party	Candidate	Votes	%	±%
CPI	Moirangthem Nabadwip	8,622	39.55%	18.98%
FPM	Dr. Leishangthem Chandramani Singh	7,700	35.32%	
INC	Akoijam Mirabai Devi	4,333	19.88%	2.32%
DRPP	Sapam Shamungou Singh	670	3.07%	
NCP	Atom Tondon Singh	423	1.94%	−8.70%
Margin of victory		922	4.23%	−13.75%
Turnout		21,800	87.95%	−3.14%
Registered electors		24,962		4.74%
CPI gain from MSCP		Swing	10.22%	

=== Assembly Election 2000 ===
2000 Manipur Legislative Assembly election: Patsoi
Party	Candidate	Votes	%	±%
MSCP	Dr. Leishangthem Chandramani Singh	7,882	38.54%	
CPI	Leishangthem Thoiren	4,206	20.57%	2.24%
INC	Akoijam Mirabai Devi	3,591	17.56%	−11.77%
SAP	Atom Tondon Singh	2,561	12.52%	
NCP	Rajkumar Nokulsana Singh	2,176	10.64%	
Margin of victory		3,676	17.97%	7.61%
Turnout		20,451	86.77%	−4.33%
Registered electors		23,833		8.92%
MSCP gain from INC		Swing	9.21%	

=== Assembly Election 1995 ===
1995 Manipur Legislative Assembly election: Patsoi
Party	Candidate	Votes	%	±%
INC	Dr. Leishangthem Chandramani Singh	5,787	29.33%	−8.19%
MPP	N. Muhindro Singh	3,742	18.97%	11.52%
CPI	Leisangthem Thoiren Singh	3,616	18.33%	
BJP	Chingsubam Shyamjai Singh	2,041	10.34%	
Independent	Sourakpam Indrajit Singh	1,859	9.42%	
FPM	Ngasepam Nimai Singh	1,766	8.95%	
IC(S)	Rajkumar Nokulsana Singh	919	4.66%	
Margin of victory		2,045	10.36%	−1.95%
Turnout		19,730	91.09%	1.99%
Registered electors		21,881		6.11%
INC gain from INS(SCS)		Swing	-20.50%	

=== Assembly Election 1990 ===
1990 Manipur Legislative Assembly election: Patsoi
Party	Candidate	Votes	%	±%
INS(SCS)	N. Ibomcha	9,103	49.83%	
INC	Dr. Leishangthem Chandramani Singh	6,854	37.52%	8.46%
MPP	S. Indrajit Singh	1,361	7.45%	−9.56%
JD	T. Rohinikumar	950	5.20%	
Margin of victory		2,249	12.31%	2.21%
Turnout		18,268	89.10%	4.01%
Registered electors		20,622		30.80%
INS(SCS) gain from INC		Swing	20.78%	

=== Assembly Election 1984 ===
1984 Manipur Legislative Assembly election: Patsoi
Party	Candidate	Votes	%	±%
INC	Dr. Leishangthem Chandramani Singh	3,792	29.06%	
Independent	Nongthombam Ibomcha Singh	2,474	18.96%	
MPP	S. Indrajit Singh	2,220	17.01%	−5.31%
JP	Nandeibam Mohendro Singh	2,180	16.70%	
IC(S)	Rajkumar Nokulsana Singh	1,850	14.18%	
BJP	Chingsubam Shyamjai Singh	535	4.10%	
Margin of victory		1,318	10.10%	5.94%
Turnout		13,051	85.09%	4.15%
Registered electors		15,766		2.70%
INC gain from JP		Swing	2.58%	

=== Assembly Election 1980 ===
1980 Manipur Legislative Assembly election: Patsoi
Party	Candidate	Votes	%	±%
JP	Dr. Leishangthem Chandramani Singh	3,225	26.48%	
MPP	Nongmaithem Ibomcha	2,718	22.32%	−23.77%
INC(U)	Ngasepam Nimai	2,240	18.39%	
CPI(M)	Sapam Ibohal Singh	1,927	15.82%	3.83%
Independent	Rajkumar Nokulsana Singh	1,905	15.64%	
INC(I)	Laurembam Nityai Singh	165	1.35%	
Margin of victory		507	4.16%	−19.28%
Turnout		12,180	80.94%	−5.91%
Registered electors		15,352		20.16%
JP gain from MPP		Swing	-19.61%	

=== Assembly Election 1974 ===
1974 Manipur Legislative Assembly election: Patsoi
Party	Candidate	Votes	%	±%
MPP	Dr. Leishangthem Chandramani Singh	5,033	46.09%	
Independent	Nongthombam Ibomcha Singh	2,473	22.65%	
INC	Rajkumar Nokulsana Singh	2,105	19.28%	−14.88%
CPI(M)	Sapam Ibohal Singh	1,309	11.99%	−10.40%
Margin of victory		2,560	23.44%	14.13%
Turnout		10,920	86.85%	−0.10%
Registered electors		12,776		58.59%
MPP gain from Independent		Swing	2.63%	

=== Assembly Election 1972 ===
1972 Manipur Legislative Assembly election: Patsoi
Party	Candidate	Votes	%	±%
Independent	Dr. Leishangthem Chandramani Singh	3,002	43.46%	
INC	Akojam Kulachandra	2,359	34.15%	
CPI(M)	Sapam Ibohal Singh	1,546	22.38%	
Margin of victory		643	9.31%	
Turnout		6,907	86.95%	
Registered electors		8,056		
Independent win (new seat)				

== See also ==
- List of constituencies of the Manipur Legislative Assembly
- Imphal West district
