= Naoriya Pakhanglakpa Assembly constituency =

Legislative Assembly constituency in Manipur State, India

Coordinates: 24.75°N 93.92°E

Naoria Pakhanglakpa
- Constituency No. 21 for the Manipur Legislative Assembly
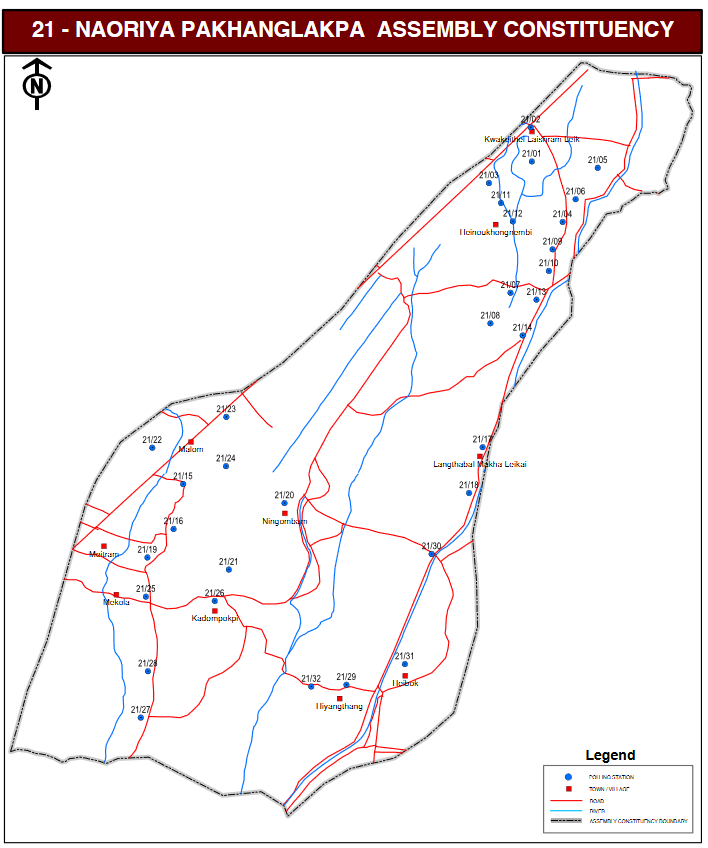

Constituency details
- Country: India
- Region: Northeast India
- State: Manipur
- District: Imphal West
- Lok Sabha constituency: Inner Manipur
- Established: 1974
- Total electors: 35,053
- Reservation: None

Member of Legislative Assembly
- 12th Manipur Legislative Assembly
- Incumbent Sagolshem Kebi Devi
- Party: Bhartiya Janata Party
- Elected year: 2022

Naoria Pakhanglakpa Legislative Assembly constituency is one of the 60 Legislative Assembly constituencies of Manipur state in India.

It is part of Imphal West district.

== Extent ==
Naoria Pakhanglakpa is the 21st of 60 constituencies of Manipur. It consists of 47 parts namely: 1 - Naoria Pakhanglakpa Irom Leikai, 2 - Heinoukhongnembi Laishram Leikai Makha, 3 - Heinoukhongnembi Laishram Leikai Awang, 4 - Heinoukhongnembi, 5 - Naoria Pakhanglakpa Lourembam Leikai, 6 - Naoria Pakhanglakpa Lourembam Leikai West, 7 - Yangam Leirak Awang, 8 - Keisham Mayai, 9 - Yangam Leirak Makha, 10 - Konjeng Langpoklakpam Leikai (A), 11 - Konjeng Langpoklakpam Leikai (B), 12 - Konjeng Ningthoujam Leikai, 13 - Chingtham Leikai (A), 14 - Chingtham Leikai (B), 15 - Konjeng Lamdong Awang Leikai, 16 - Konjeng Lamdong Leikai (A), 17 - Konjeng Lamdong Leikai (B), 18 - Mongshangei Awang, 19 - Mongshangei (A), 20 - Mongshangei (B), 21 - Mongshangei Makha, 22 - Malom Tulihal (A), 23 - Malom Tulihal (B), 24 - Langthabal Lep Awang, 25 - Langthabal Lep Mayai (A), 26 - Langthabal Lep Makha, 27 - Langthabal Lep Mayai (B), 28 - Meitram, 29 - Meitram Awang Leikai, 30 - Ningombam Awang, 31 - Ningombam Makha, 32 - Malom Tuliyaima Makha, 33 - Malom Tuliyaima (A), 34 - Malom Tuliyaima (B), 35 - Kodompokpi, 36 - Kodompokpi (A), 37 - Kodompokpi Mamang, 38 - Kodompokpi (B), 39 - Lairenjam Makha, 40 - Lairenjam Awang Leikai, 41 - Lairenjam Sabal, 42 - Hiyangthang, 43 - Hiyangthang Mamang, 44 - Langthabal Phuramakhong, 45 - Hiyangthang Tarahei Konjil, 46 - Hiyangthang Maning, and 47 - Hiyangthang Maning Makha.

== Members of the Legislative Assembly ==
Year	Member	Party
1980	Wahengbam Angou	Indian National Congress
1984	Wahengbam Angou	Indian National Congress
1995	A. K. Lanngam	Independent
2000	Wahengbam Leima Devi	Independent
2002	Wahengbam Leima Devi	Indian National Congress
2007	R. K. Anand	Manipur Peoples Party
2012	R. K. Anand	Indian National Congress
2017	Soibam Subhaschandra Singh	Bharatiya Janata Party
2022	Soraisam Kebi Devi	Bharatiya Janata Party

== Election results ==
Vote share of winning candidates
2022	33.55%
2017	28.38%
2012	32.87%
2007	39.41%
2002	24.52%
2000	25.22%
1995	32.62%
1984	31.48%
1980	38.59%
1974	32.33%

=== 2027 Assembly election ===
2027 Manipur Legislative Assembly election: Naoriya Pakhanglakpa
Party	Candidate	Votes	%	±%
INC				
NDA				
NOTA	None of the above			
Majority				
Turnout				
gain from		Swing		

=== Assembly Election 2022 ===
2022 Manipur Legislative Assembly election: Naoriya Pakhanglakpa
Party	Candidate	Votes	%	±%
BJP	Soraisam Kebi Devi	11,058	33.55%	5.16%
NPP	Soibam Subhaschandra Singh	10,527	31.93%	
INC	Soraisham Manaoton Singh	9,444	28.65%	5.59%
JD(U)	Konthoujam Manoranjan Singh	1,721	5.22%	
NOTA	Nota	214	0.65%	0.14%
Margin of victory		531	1.61%	−3.71%
Turnout		32,964	94.04%	1.00%
Registered electors		35,053		7.51%
BJP hold		Swing	5.16%	

=== Assembly Election 2017 ===
2017 Manipur Legislative Assembly election: Naoriya Pakhanglakpa
Party	Candidate	Votes	%	±%
BJP	Soibam Subhaschandra Singh	8,609	28.38%	27.49%
INC	R. K. Anand	6,994	23.06%	−9.81%
AITC	Soraisham Manaoton Singh	6,121	20.18%	
LJP	Konthoujam Manoranjan Singh	4,777	15.75%	
NEIDP	Oinam Malesh Singh	3,610	11.90%	
NOTA	None of the Above	153	0.50%	
Margin of victory		1,615	5.32%	−2.25%
Turnout		30,334	93.04%	7.60%
Registered electors		32,603		4.64%
BJP gain from INC		Swing	-4.49%	

=== Assembly Election 2012 ===
2012 Manipur Legislative Assembly election: Naoriya Pakhanglakpa
Party	Candidate	Votes	%	±%
INC	R. K. Anand	8,750	32.87%	8.47%
AITC	Keisham Rojenkumar Singh	6,735	25.30%	
NCP	Soibam Subhaschandra Singh	6,324	23.76%	19.80%
CPI	Oinam Malesh Singh	4,571	17.17%	
BJP	Sanasam Mangi	237	0.89%	
Margin of victory		2,015	7.57%	−2.61%
Turnout		26,620	85.43%	−5.93%
Registered electors		31,157		5.85%
INC gain from MPP		Swing	-6.54%	

=== Assembly Election 2007 ===
2007 Manipur Legislative Assembly election: Naoriya Pakhanglakpa
Party	Candidate	Votes	%	±%
MPP	R. K. Anand	10,598	39.41%	19.85%
RJD	Keisham Rojenkumar Singh	7,861	29.23%	
INC	Wahengbam Leima Devi	6,561	24.40%	−0.13%
NCP	Sinam Kumar Singh	1,065	3.96%	2.82%
RSP	Chingtham Priyokumar Singh	808	3.00%	
Margin of victory		2,737	10.18%	7.08%
Turnout		26,893	91.37%	−1.93%
Registered electors		29,434		17.19%
MPP gain from INC		Swing	14.88%	

=== Assembly Election 2002 ===
2002 Manipur Legislative Assembly election: Naoriya Pakhanglakpa
Party	Candidate	Votes	%	±%
INC	Wahengbam Leima Devi	5,712	24.52%	16.03%
DRPP	R. K. Anand	4,990	21.42%	
MPP	Keisham Rojenkumar Singh	4,555	19.56%	3.31%
MSCP	A. K. Ibobi Singh	4,340	18.63%	5.28%
FPM	Chingtham Priyokumar Singh	3,033	13.02%	10.82%
SAP	Maibam Sobhachandra Singh	298	1.28%	−16.02%
NCP	Sinam Radhapriyari Devi	265	1.14%	0.02%
Margin of victory		722	3.10%	−4.82%
Turnout		23,291	93.30%	−1.16%
Registered electors		25,117		6.84%
INC gain from Independent		Swing	-8.10%	

=== Assembly Election 2000 ===
2000 Manipur Legislative Assembly election: Naoriya Pakhanglakpa
Party	Candidate	Votes	%	±%
Independent	Wahengbam Leima Devi	5,418	25.22%	
SAP	Akoijam Ibobi	3,716	17.30%	
MPP	Keisham Rojenkumar Singh	3,490	16.24%	−9.21%
MSCP	Chingtham Priyokumar Singh	2,868	13.35%	
INC	Akoijam Lanngam	1,824	8.49%	−20.27%
JD(U)	Yumkhaibam Biren Singh	1,554	7.23%	
BJP	Mutum Chaoba Meetei	1,012	4.71%	
Independent	R. K. Anand	889	4.14%	
FPM	Nodiya Singh	474	2.21%	
NCP	Maibam Sobhachandra Singh	240	1.12%	
Margin of victory		1,702	7.92%	4.06%
Turnout		21,485	92.33%	−2.14%
Registered electors		23,510		6.86%
Independent hold		Swing	-7.40%	

=== Assembly Election 1995 ===
1995 Manipur Legislative Assembly election: Naoriya Pakhanglakpa
Party	Candidate	Votes	%	±%
Independent	A. K. Lanngam	6,711	32.62%	
INC	Wahengbam Angou Singh	5,916	28.76%	
MPP	A. K. Ibobi Singh	5,237	25.46%	
Independent	Ch. Priyokumar Singh	2,014	9.79%	
CPI(M)	Th. Joy	366	1.78%	
IC(S)	Y. Kala Singh	267	1.30%	
Margin of victory		795	3.86%	
Turnout		20,573	94.46%	
Registered electors		22,001		
Independent win (new seat)				

=== Assembly Election 1984 ===
1984 Manipur Legislative Assembly election: Naoriya Pakhanglakpa
Party	Candidate	Votes	%	±%
INC	Wahengbam Angou Singh	5,033	31.48%	
MPP	Akoijam Ibobi	4,130	25.83%	−4.49%
LKD	Akoijam Lanngam	3,478	21.75%	
JP	Tokpam Somorendra	2,888	18.06%	
IC(S)	Khaidem Dhananjoy	461	2.88%	
Margin of victory		903	5.65%	−2.62%
Turnout		15,990	90.67%	4.48%
Registered electors		17,958		9.55%
INC gain from INC(U)		Swing	-7.11%	

=== Assembly Election 1980 ===
1980 Manipur Legislative Assembly election: Naoriya Pakhanglakpa
Party	Candidate	Votes	%	±%
INC(U)	Wahengbam Angou Singh	5,320	38.59%	
MPP	Akoijam Ibobi	4,180	30.32%	−2.01%
JP(S)	Akoijam Lanngam	1,567	11.37%	
JP	Th. Brajabidhu	1,486	10.78%	
INC(I)	S. Mangi Singh	767	5.56%	
Independent	Kh. Dhanajoy	261	1.89%	
Independent	K. Shyam Singh	206	1.49%	
Margin of victory		1,140	8.27%	3.42%
Turnout		13,787	86.18%	1.27%
Registered electors		16,392		22.80%
INC(U) gain from MPP		Swing	6.26%	

=== Assembly Election 1974 ===
1974 Manipur Legislative Assembly election: Naoriya Pakhanglakpa
Party	Candidate	Votes	%	±%
MPP	Tokpam Sanajao Singh	3,626	32.33%	
INC	Wahengbam Angou Singh	3,082	27.48%	
Independent	Thounaojam Brajabidhu	2,432	21.68%	
Independent	Yumkhaibam Yaima	1,404	12.52%	
Independent	Koijam Kerani	565	5.04%	
Socialist Party (India)	Nongthombam Ibocha Singh	107	0.95%	
Margin of victory		544	4.85%	
Turnout		11,216	84.91%	
Registered electors		13,348		
MPP win (new seat)				

== See also ==
- List of constituencies of the Manipur Legislative Assembly
- Imphal West district
