= Lilong Assembly constituency =

Legislative Assembly constituency in Manipur State, India

Coordinates: 24.71°N 93.93°E

Lilong
- Constituency No. 30 for the Manipur Legislative Assembly

Constituency details
- Country: India
- Region: Northeast India
- State: Manipur
- District: Thoubal
- Lok Sabha constituency: Inner Manipur
- Established: 1967
- Total electors: 36,006
- Reservation: None

Member of Legislative Assembly
- 12th Manipur Legislative Assembly
- Incumbent Muhammad Abdul Nasir
- Party: JD(U)
- Alliance: NDA
- Elected year: 2022

Lilong Legislative Assembly constituency is one of the 60 Legislative Assembly constituencies of Manipur state in India.

It is a part of Thoubal district.

== Members of the Legislative Assembly ==
1967	Mohammed Alimuddin	Indian National Congress
1972	Mohammed Alimuddin	Manipur Peoples Party
1974	Mohammed Alimuddin	Manipur Peoples Party
1980	Md. Helaluddin Khan	Indian National Congress
1984	Alauddin	Manipur Peoples Party
1990	Md. Helaluddin Khan	Indian National Congress
1995	Md. Helaluddin Khan	Indian National Congress
2000	Alauddin	Nationalist Congress Party
2002	Dr. Md. Maniruddin Shaikh	Indian National Congress
2007	Md. Helaluddin Khan	Rashtriya Janata Dal
2012	Muhammad Abdul Nasir	Indian National Congress
2017	Muhammad Abdul Nasir	Indian National Congress
2020 (Note: by-election)	Y. Antas Khan	Independent
2022	Muhammad Abdul Nasir	Janata Dal

== Election results ==
Vote share of winning candidates
2022	49.71%
2020	54.69%
2017	36.69%
2012	42.28%
2007	41.31%
2002	38.65%
2000	35.89%
1995	37.06%
1990	53.87%
1984	27.80%
1980	59.41%
1974	57.44%
1972	56.48%
1967	38.02%

=== 2027 Assembly election ===
2027 Manipur Legislative Assembly election: Lilong
Party	Candidate	Votes	%	±%
INC				
NDA				
NOTA	None of the above			
Majority				
Turnout				
gain from		Swing		

=== 2022 Assembly election ===
2022 Manipur Legislative Assembly election: Lilong
Party	Candidate	Votes	%	±%
JD(U)	Muhammad Abdul Nasir	16,886	49.71%	New
BJP	Y. Antas Khan	16,316	48.03%	New
INC	Syed Anwar Hussain	445	1.31%	New
NOTA	None of the Above	140	0.41%	▼0.08
Margin of victory		570	1.68%	▼8.16
Turnout		33,969	94.34%	▲1.00
Registered electors		36,006		▲7.46
JD(U) gain from Independent		Swing	▼4.98	

=== 2020 Assembly by-election ===
2020 Manipur Legislative Assembly by-election: Lilong
Party	Candidate	Votes	%	±%
Independent	Y. Antas Khan	17,106	54.69%	New
Independent	Mohd. Abdul Nasir	14,028	44.85%	New
NOTA	None of the Above	153	0.49%	New
Margin of victory		3,078	9.84%	▲5.52
Turnout		31,276	93.83%	▼0.74
Registered electors		33,506		▲7.45
Independent gain from INC		Swing	▲18.00	

=== 2017 Assembly election ===
2017 Manipur Legislative Assembly election: Lilong
Party	Candidate	Votes	%	±%
INC	Muhammad Abdul Nasir	10,765	36.69%	▼5.58
Independent	Y. Antas Khan	9,497	32.37%	New
BJP	Md. Anwar Hussain	8,456	28.82%	New
NEIDP	Sheikh Kheiruddin	369	1.26%	New
NOTA	None of the Above	100	0.34%	New
Margin of victory		1,268	4.32%	▼11.36
Turnout		29,337	94.08%	▲3.48
Registered electors		31,182		▲11.97
INC hold		Swing	▼5.58	

=== 2012 Assembly election ===
2012 Manipur Legislative Assembly election: Lilong
Party	Candidate	Votes	%	±%
INC	Muhammad Abdul Nasir	10,668	42.28%	▲7.53
Independent	Md. Azizul Haque Khan	6,711	26.60%	New
AITC	Md. Alauddin	6,332	25.09%	New
SDPI	Mohd. Khalid	604	2.39%	New
MSCP	Md. Azizur Rahman Shah	582	2.31%	New
Independent	Dr. Badaruddin	282	1.12%	New
Margin of victory		3,957	15.68%	▲9.12
Turnout		25,233	90.61%	▼2.04
Registered electors		27,849		▲8.24
INC gain from RJD		Swing	▲0.97	

=== 2007 Assembly election ===
2007 Manipur Legislative Assembly election: Lilong
Party	Candidate	Votes	%	±%
RJD	Md. Helaluddin Khan	9,848	41.31%	New
INC	Dr. Md. Maniruddin Shaikh	8,283	34.75%	▼3.90
NCP	Md. Alauddin	5,708	23.94%	New
Margin of victory		1,565	6.56%	▼1.08
Turnout		23,839	92.65%	▲0.20
Registered electors		25,730		▲21.59
RJD gain from INC		Swing		

=== 2002 Assembly election ===
2002 Manipur Legislative Assembly election: Lilong
Party	Candidate	Votes	%	±%
INC	Dr. Md. Maniruddin Shaikh	7,561	38.65%	▲3.58
Manipur National Conference	Md. Helaluddin Khan	6,066	31.00%	New
FPM	Dr. Badaruddin	5,465	27.93%	New
DRPP	Ismail	115	0.59%	New
Margin of victory		1,495	7.64%	▲6.82
Turnout		19,565	92.45%	▲0.94
Registered electors		21,162		▲3.63
INC gain from NCP		Swing	▲2.76	

=== 2000 Assembly election ===
2000 Manipur Legislative Assembly election: Lilong
Party	Candidate	Votes	%	±%
NCP	Alauddin	6,706	35.89%	New
INC	Dr. Md. Maniruddin Shaikh	6,553	35.07%	▼1.99
MSCP	Md. Helaluddin Khan	5,084	27.21%	New
Margin of victory		153	0.82%	▼5.01
Turnout		18,687	91.51%	▼1.64
Registered electors		20,420		▲10.65
NCP gain from INC		Swing		

=== 1995 Assembly election ===
1995 Manipur Legislative Assembly election: Lilong
Party	Candidate	Votes	%	±%
INC	Md. Helaluddin Khan	6,371	37.06%	▼16.81
MPP	Alauddin	5,369	31.23%	▼12.64
JD	Abdul Gani	3,422	19.90%	New
CPI	Dr. Badaruddin	1,485	8.64%	New
IC(S)	Abdul Jabar	162	0.94%	New
Margin of victory		1,002	5.83%	▼4.17
Turnout		17,192	93.16%	▼1.71
Registered electors		18,455		▲7.00
INC hold		Swing	▼16.81	

=== 1990 Assembly election ===
1990 Manipur Legislative Assembly election: Lilong
Party	Candidate	Votes	%	±%
INC	Md. Helaluddin Khan	8,814	53.87%	▲28.16
MPP	Alauddin	7,178	43.87%	▲16.07
Margin of victory		1,636	10.00%	▲7.91
Turnout		16,362	94.86%	▲6.07
Registered electors		17,248		▼2.56
INC gain from MPP		Swing		

=== 1984 Assembly election ===
1984 Manipur Legislative Assembly election: Lilong
Party	Candidate	Votes	%	±%
MPP	Alauddin	4,369	27.80%	▲26.93
INC	Md. Helaluddin Khan	4,041	25.71%	New
JP	Habibur Rhaman	3,439	21.88%	▼14.56
IC(S)	Ismain	2,244	14.28%	New
BJP	Laidhram Goshai Singh	969	6.17%	New
Margin of victory		328	2.09%	▼20.88
Turnout		15,717	88.79%	▲0.83
Registered electors		17,701		▲21.26
MPP gain from INC(I)		Swing	▼31.61	

=== 1980 Assembly election ===
1980 Manipur Legislative Assembly election: Lilong
Party	Candidate	Votes	%	±%
INC(I)	Md. Helaluddin Khan	7,629	59.41%	New
JP	Mohammed Alimuddin	4,680	36.45%	New
MPP	Md. Alauddin	111	0.86%	▼56.58
Margin of victory		2,949	22.97%	▲4.95
Turnout		12,841	87.96%	▲1.76
Registered electors		14,598		▲20.69
INC(I) gain from MPP		Swing	▲1.97	

=== 1974 Assembly election ===
1974 Manipur Legislative Assembly election: Lilong
Party	Candidate	Votes	%	±%
MPP	Mohammed Alimuddin	5,989	57.44%	▲0.97
INC	Abdul Quadir Shah	4,111	39.43%	▼2.26
Margin of victory		1,878	18.01%	▲3.22
Turnout		10,426	86.20%	▼1.85
Registered electors		12,095		▲34.97
MPP hold		Swing	▲0.97	

=== 1972 Assembly election ===
1972 Manipur Legislative Assembly election: Lilong
Party	Candidate	Votes	%	±%
MPP	Mohammed Alimuddin	4,456	56.48%	New
INC	Abdul Gani	3,289	41.69%	▲3.66
Margin of victory		1,167	14.79%	▲13.22
Turnout		7,890	88.05%	▲2.51
Registered electors		8,961		▼43.94
MPP gain from INC		Swing	▲18.46	

=== 1967 Assembly election ===
1967 Manipur Legislative Assembly election: Lilong
Party	Candidate	Votes	%	±%
INC	Mohammed Alimuddin	5,199	38.02%	New
Independent	H. Rahaman	4,984	36.45%	New
Independent	T. Jatra	3,116	22.79%	New
Margin of victory		215	1.57%	
Turnout		13,674	85.54%	
Registered electors		15,985		
INC win (new seat)				

== See also ==
- List of constituencies of the Manipur Legislative Assembly
- Thoubal district
