= Soibam Subhaschandra Singh =

Indian politician

Member of Manipur Legislative Assembly
- In office 11 March 2017 – 17 June 2020
- Preceded by: R. K. Anand
- Succeeded by: Soraisam Kebi Devi
- Constituency: Naoriya Pakhanglakpa

Personal details
- Party: Indian National Congress (2020-present); Bharatiya Janata Party (pre-2020)
- Education: Diploma in Automobile Engineering
- Alma mater: Chennai Institute of Technology
- Profession: Social Worker

Soibam Subhaschandra Singh is an Indian politician from Manipur. In March 2017, he was elected as a member of the Manipur Legislative Assembly from Naoriya Pakhanglakpa (constituency) as a member of Bharatiya Janata Party. He defeated R. K. Anand of Indian National Congress by 1,615 votes in 2017 Manipur Assembly election. He was one of three MLAs who resigned from Bharatiya Janata Party and joined the Indian National Congress in June 2020.
