= Y. Antas Khan =

Indian politician

Y. Antas Khan is an Indian politician and former member of the Manipur Legislative Assembly representing Lilong. He was elected from Lilong in the 2020 Manipur Legislative Assembly by-elections following the resignation of Muhammad Abdul Nasir as an Independent candidate. In February 2022, Khan was the only Muslim candidate of Bharatiya Janata Party in the five state assembly election that year.
