= Thanga Assembly constituency =

Legislative Assembly constituency in Manipur State, India

Coordinates: 24.53°N 93.83°E

Thanga
- Constituency No. 28 for the Manipur Legislative Assembly

Constituency details
- Country: India
- Region: Northeast India
- State: Manipur
- District: Bishnupur
- Lok Sabha constituency: Inner Manipur
- Established: 1972
- Total electors: 22,984
- Reservation: None

Member of Legislative Assembly
- 12th Manipur Legislative Assembly
- Incumbent Tongbram Robindro Singh
- Party: Bharatiya Janata Party
- Elected year: 2022

Thanga is one of the 60 Legislative Assembly constituencies of Manipur state in India.

It is part of Bishnupur district. As of 2022, it is represented by Tongbram Robindro Singh of the Bharatiya Janata Party.

== Extent ==
Thanga is the 28th among 60 constituencies of Manipur. It consists of 28 parts namely: 1 - Thanga Karang (A), 2 - Thanga Karang (B), 3 - Thanga Chingkha(A), 4 - Thanga Chingkha(B), 5 - Thanga Heisnam Leikai (A), 6 - Thanga Heisnam Leikai (B), 7 - Thanga Salam Leikai (A), 8 - Thanga Salam Leikai (B), 9 - Thanga Oinam Leikai, 10 - Samukon, 11 - Thanga Moirangthem Leikai (A-1), 12 - Thanga Moirangthem Leikai (A-2), 13 - Thanga Moirangthem Leikai (B), 14 - Ithing (A), 15 - Ithing (B), 16 - Keibul (A), 17 - Keibul (B), 18 - Chingmei Chandapur (A), 19 - Chingmei Chandapur (B), 20 - Moirang Khunou (A), 21 - Moirang Khunou (B), 22 - Moirang Khunou (C), 23 - Kha Thinungei (A), 24 - Kha Thinungei (B), 25 - Keirenphabi, 26 - Khordak, 27 - Nongmaikhong, and 28 - Champu Khangpok.

== Members of the Legislative Assembly ==
Year	Name	Party
2007	Tongbram Mangibabu Singh	Indian National Congress
2012	Tongbram Mangibabu Singh	Indian National Congress
2017	Tongbram Robindro Singh	All India Trinamool Congress
2022	Tongbram Robindro Singh	Bharatiya Janata Party

== Election results ==
Vote share of winning candidates
2022	61.96%
2017	33.06%
2012	26.74%
2007	35.51%
2002	23.33%
2000	25.75%
1995	30.19%
1990	24.45%
1984	24.28%
1980	36.84%
1974	35.49%
1972	41.66%
1967	46.68%

=== 2027 Assembly election ===
2027 Manipur Legislative Assembly election: Thanga
Party	Candidate	Votes	%	±%
INC				
NDA				
NOTA	None of the above			
Majority				
Turnout				
gain from		Swing		

=== Assembly Election 2022 ===
2022 Manipur Legislative Assembly election: Thanga
Party	Candidate	Votes	%	±%
BJP	Tongbram Robindro Singh	13,095	61.96%	34.04%
INC	Birla Haobijam	7,844	37.11%	11.18%
NOTA	Nota	196	0.93%	0.43%
Margin of victory		5,251	24.85%	19.70%
Turnout		21,135	91.96%	−1.48%
Registered electors		22,984		9.86%
BJP gain from AITC		Swing	28.90%	

=== Assembly Election 2017 ===
2017 Manipur Legislative Assembly election: Thanga
Party	Candidate	Votes	%	±%
AITC	Tongbram Robindro Singh	6,462	33.06%	
BJP	Moirangthem Asnikumar Singh	5,457	27.92%	26.23%
INC	Tongbram Mangibabu Singh	5,070	25.94%	−0.80%
NCP	Heisnam Kulachandra Singh	2,461	12.59%	
NOTA	None of the Above	97	0.50%	
Margin of victory		1,005	5.14%	4.20%
Turnout		19,547	93.43%	3.38%
Registered electors		20,921		3.21%
AITC gain from INC		Swing	6.32%	

=== Assembly Election 2012 ===
2012 Manipur Legislative Assembly election: Thanga
Party	Candidate	Votes	%	±%
INC	Tongbram Mangibabu Singh	4,881	26.74%	−8.77%
AITC	Tongbram Robindro Singh	4,710	25.80%	
CPI	Moirangthem Asnikumar Singh	3,492	19.13%	3.83%
MPP	Haobijam Manisana Singh	3,066	16.80%	−12.29%
MSCP	Heisnam Kulachandra Singh	1,796	9.84%	
BJP	Salam Ibohal Singh	308	1.69%	
Margin of victory		171	0.94%	−5.49%
Turnout		18,254	90.04%	−0.14%
Registered electors		20,271		1.24%
INC hold		Swing	-8.77%	

=== Assembly Election 2007 ===
2007 Manipur Legislative Assembly election: Thanga
Party	Candidate	Votes	%	±%
INC	Tongbram Mangibabu Singh	6,412	35.51%	18.82%
MPP	Haobijam Manisana Singh	5,252	29.08%	
SP	Salam Ibohal Singh	3,485	19.30%	
CPI	Heisnam Sanayaima Singh	2,762	15.30%	
Margin of victory		1,160	6.42%	6.33%
Turnout		18,058	90.19%	−2.16%
Registered electors		20,022		11.94%
INC gain from FPM		Swing	12.18%	

=== Assembly Election 2002 ===
2002 Manipur Legislative Assembly election: Thanga
Party	Candidate	Votes	%	±%
FPM	Salam Ibohal Singh	3,781	23.33%	
MSCP	Haobijam Manisana Singh	3,765	23.23%	−2.53%
BJP	Haobijam Kangjamba Singh	3,220	19.86%	−5.53%
INC	Tongbram Mangibabu Singh	2,705	16.69%	−7.27%
NCP	Heisnam Sanayaima Singh	2,173	13.41%	
SAP	Moirangthem Asnikumar Singh	566	3.49%	
Margin of victory		16	0.10%	−0.26%
Turnout		16,210	92.35%	−1.64%
Registered electors		17,886		4.37%
FPM gain from MSCP		Swing	-6.86%	

=== Assembly Election 2000 ===
2000 Manipur Legislative Assembly election: Thanga
Party	Candidate	Votes	%	±%
MSCP	Heisnam Sanayaima Singh	3,992	25.75%	
BJP	Haobijam Kangjamba Singh	3,936	25.39%	3.04%
MPP	Salam Ibohal Singh	3,860	24.90%	1.54%
INC	Tongbram Mangibabu Singh	3,713	23.95%	−0.14%
Margin of victory		56	0.36%	−5.73%
Turnout		15,501	92.26%	−1.74%
Registered electors		17,137		11.36%
MSCP gain from JD		Swing	-4.44%	

=== Assembly Election 1995 ===
1995 Manipur Legislative Assembly election: Thanga
Party	Candidate	Votes	%	±%
JD	Tongbram Mangibabu Singh	4,277	30.19%	
INC	Heisnam Sanayaima Singh	3,414	24.10%	2.43%
MPP	Salam Ibohal Singh	3,310	23.36%	−1.09%
BJP	Haobijam Kangjamba Singh	3,166	22.35%	1.13%
Margin of victory		863	6.09%	3.31%
Turnout		14,167	94.00%	2.37%
Registered electors		15,389		4.53%
JD gain from MPP		Swing	5.74%	

=== Assembly Election 1990 ===
1990 Manipur Legislative Assembly election: Thanga
Party	Candidate	Votes	%	±%
MPP	Salam Ibohal Singh	3,210	24.45%	
INC	Heisnam Sanayaima Singh	2,845	21.67%	−1.29%
BJP	Haobijam Kangjamba Singh	2,786	21.22%	
JD	Tongbram Mangibabu Singh	2,542	19.36%	
INS(SCS)	Salam Jayantakumar Singh	1,745	13.29%	
Margin of victory		365	2.78%	1.87%
Turnout		13,128	91.62%	−0.85%
Registered electors		14,722		21.35%
MPP gain from Independent		Swing	0.17%	

=== Assembly Election 1984 ===
1984 Manipur Legislative Assembly election: Thanga
Party	Candidate	Votes	%	±%
Independent	Heisnam Sanayaima Singh	2,628	24.28%	
Independent	Salam Ibohal Singh	2,529	23.37%	
INC	Haobijam Kangjamba Singh	2,485	22.96%	
JP	Tongbram Mangibabu Singh	1,844	17.04%	
IC(S)	Salam Jayantakumar Singh	1,336	12.35%	
Margin of victory		99	0.91%	−6.56%
Turnout		10,822	92.47%	2.11%
Registered electors		12,132		6.05%
Independent hold		Swing	-12.56%	

=== Assembly Election 1980 ===
1980 Manipur Legislative Assembly election: Thanga
Party	Candidate	Votes	%	±%
Independent	Haojam Kangjamba Singh	3,711	36.84%	
JP(S)	Kaisanam Yaima	2,958	29.37%	
INC(I)	Salam Ibohal Singh	1,907	18.93%	
JP	Salam Jayantakumar Singh	1,398	13.88%	
MPP	Labuktongbam Kondum	99	0.98%	−33.32%
Margin of victory		753	7.48%	6.30%
Turnout		10,073	90.37%	1.38%
Registered electors		11,440		14.42%
Independent gain from INC		Swing	1.35%	

=== Assembly Election 1974 ===
1974 Manipur Legislative Assembly election: Thanga
Party	Candidate	Votes	%	±%
INC	Salam Jayantakumar Singh	3,037	35.49%	8.62%
MPP	Heisnam Yaima Singh	2,936	34.31%	32.14%
Socialist Party (India)	Haobijam Kanjamba Singh	2,585	30.21%	
Margin of victory		101	1.18%	−13.61%
Turnout		8,558	88.99%	8.20%
Registered electors		9,998		13.59%
INC gain from Socialist Party (India)		Swing	-6.17%	

=== Assembly Election 1972 ===
1972 Manipur Legislative Assembly election: Thanga
Party	Candidate	Votes	%	±%
Socialist Party (India)	Haobijam Kangjamba Singh	2,878	41.66%	
INC	Salam Jayantakumar Singh	1,856	26.87%	−19.81%
Independent	Heisnam Yaima Singh	1,326	19.20%	
Independent	Oinam Lukhoi	698	10.10%	
MPP	Ningthoujam Duhar	150	2.17%	
Margin of victory		1,022	14.79%	4.76%
Turnout		6,908	80.79%	3.89%
Registered electors		8,802		−48.08%
Socialist Party (India) gain from INC		Swing	-5.02%	

=== Assembly Election 1967 ===
1967 Manipur Legislative Assembly election: Thanga
Party	Candidate	Votes	%	±%
INC	Mairembam Koireng Singh	5,823	46.68%	
SSP	Haobijam Kangjamba Singh	4,571	36.64%	
Independent	Ibocha	1,096	8.79%	
Independent	K. Maniangou	701	5.62%	
Independent	Bhanu	284	2.28%	
Margin of victory		1,252	10.04%	
Turnout		12,475	76.90%	
Registered electors		16,954		
INC win (new seat)				

== See also ==
- List of constituencies of the Manipur Legislative Assembly
- Bishnupur district
