= Ngamthang Haokip =

Indian politician

Member of Manipur Legislative Assembly
- In office 2012–2020
- Preceded by: Haokholet Kipgen
- Constituency: Saitu
- In office 2002–2007
- Preceded by: Haokholet Kipgen
- Succeeded by: Haokholet Kipgen
- Constituency: Saitu
- In office 1990–2000
- Preceded by: S. L. Paokhosei
- Succeeded by: Haokholet Kipgen
- Constituency: Saitu

Personal details
- Born: Ngamthang Haokip
- Party: Bharatiya Janata Party
- Other political affiliations: Indian National Congress
- Profession: Social Worker

Ngamthang Haokip is a former Minister of Manipur and member of the Indian National Congress. Haokip was elected as a member of the Manipur Legislative Assembly from Saitu constituency in Kangpokpi District from the Indian National Congress in 2017. He resigned from Indian National Congress and later joined Bharatiya Janata Party.

Manipur Legislative Assembly from Saitu constituency in Kangpokpi District from the Indian National Congress in 2017.

During the 2020 Manipur vote of confidence, he was one of the eight MLAs who had skipped the assembly proceedings defying the party whip for the trust vote. He resigned from Indian National Congress and later joined Bharatiya Janata Party in presence of Ram Madhav, Baijayant Panda and Chief Minister of Manipur N. Biren Singh.

== History ==
- Elected MLA from 51-Saitu(ST) A/C, 5th Manipur Legislative Assembly 1990
- Elected MLA from 51-Saitu(ST) A/C, 6th Manipur Legislative Assembly 1995
- Elected MLA from 51-Saitu(ST) A/C, 8th Manipur Legislative Assembly 2002
- Elected MLA from 51-Saitu(ST) A/C, 10th Manipur Legislative Assembly 2012
- Elected MLA from 51-Saitu(ST) A/C, 11th Manipur Legislative Assembly 2017.
