= Laisom Ibomcha Singh =

Indian politician

Laisom Ibomcha Singh was an Indian politician and member of the Nationalist Congress Party.

He served as a member of the Manipur Legislative Assembly from the Keishamthong constituency in Imphal West district after winning the 2002 Manipur Assembly elections.

He died in 2020 from COVID-19.
