= Tongbram Robindro Singh =

Indian politician

Member of Manipur Legislative Assembly
- Incumbent
- Assumed office 15 March 2017
- Governor: Najma Heptulla Ganga Prasad La. Ganesan Anusuiya Uikey Lakshman Acharya Ajay Kumar Bhalla
- Chief Minister: Nongthombam Biren Singh Yumnam Khemchand Singh
- Preceded by: Tongbram Mangibabu Singh
- Constituency: Thanga

Personal details
- Born: 2 October 1972 (aged 53) Keirenphabi Mamang Leikei, Bishnupur District, Manipur
- Party: Bharatiya Janata Party
- Other political affiliations: All India Trinamool Congress (till 2022)
- Spouse: Priyadarshini Laishram

Tongbram Robindro Singh (born 1973) is an Indian politician from Manipur. He is an MLA from Thanga Assembly constituency in Bishnupur district. He won the 2022 Manipur Legislative Assembly election, representing the Bharatiya Janata Party.

== Early life and education ==
Singh is from Keirenphabi Mamang Leikei in Moirang tehsil, Bishnupur district, Manipur. He is the son of Tongbram Tompok Singh and married Priyadarshini Laishram, who serves as the Superintendent of Police for Immigration in the Manipur Police Service. They have two sons, Vishwashanth Tongbram and Puruashanth. He completed his Class 12 (science) in 1989 through CBSE stream at Delhi Public School, Mathura Road, New Delhi.

== Career ==
Singh won from Thanga Assembly constituency representing the Bharatiya Janata Party in the 2022 Manipur Legislative Assembly election. He polled 13,095 votes and defeated his nearest rival, Birla Haobijam of the Indian National Congress, by 5,251 votes. He became an MLA for the first time in the 2017 Manipur Legislative Assembly election representing All India Trinamool Congress. Later in January 2022, the lone Trinamool member in the Manipur Assembly joined the BJP before the elections. In the 2012 Manipur Legislative Assembly election, he had contested on a Trinamool ticket but lost to the Indian National Congress candidate Tongbram Mangibabu Singh by 171 votes.
