= R. K. Anand (Manipur politician) =

Indian politician

R.K. Anand

MLA, Manipur Legislative Assembly
- In office 2007–2017

Personal details
- Born: 1 February 1961 (age 65) Imphal, Manipur, India
- Party: BJP
- Spouse: N. Usharani Devi
- Parent: Late Shri R.K. Tombi

R.K. Anand (born 1 February 1961) is a politician from the Indian state of Manipur. He represented the Naoriya assembly constituency for two terms from 2007 to 2012 and from 2012 to 2017.
