= Saitu Assembly constituency =

Legislative Assembly constituency in Manipur State, India

Coordinates: 25.03°N 93.91°E

Saitu
- Constituency for the Manipur Legislative Assembly

Constituency details
- Country: India
- Region: Northeast India
- State: Manipur
- District: Senapati
- Lok Sabha constituency: Outer Manipur
- Established: 1972
- Total electors: 44,686
- Reservation: ST

Member of Legislative Assembly
- 12th Manipur Legislative Assembly
- Incumbent Haokholet Kipgen
- Party: Independent
- Elected year: 2022

Saitu is one of the 60 Legislative Assembly constituencies of Manipur state in India.

It is part of Kangpokpi district and is reserved for candidates belonging to the Scheduled Tribes.

== Members of the Legislative Assembly ==
Year	Member	Party
1972	Paolen	Indian National Congress
1974	Zampu	Kuki National Assembly
1980	L. S. John	Independent politician
1984	S. L. Paokhosei	Indian National Congress
1990	Ngamthang Haokip	Manipur Peoples Party
1995	Ngamthang Haokip	Manipur Peoples Party
2000	Haokholet Kipgen	Federal Party of Manipur
2002	Ngamthang Haokip	Indian National Congress
2007	Haokholet Kipgen	Independent politician
2012	Ngamthang Haokip	Indian National Congress
2017	Ngamthang Haokip	Indian National Congress
2020 by-election	Ngamthang Haokip	Bharatiya Janata Party
2022	Haokholet Kipgen	Independent politician

== Election results ==
Vote share of winning candidates
2022	31.52%
2020 By-election	66.63%
2017	53.49%
2012	55.99%
2007	53.79%
2002	42.93%
2000	47.89%
1995	38.13%
1990	40.12%
1984	26.44%
1980	17.98%
1974	20.48%
1972	16.35%

=== 2027 Assembly election ===
2027 Manipur Legislative Assembly election: Saitu
Party	Candidate	Votes	%	±%
INC				
NDA				
NOTA	None of the above			
Majority				
Turnout				
gain from		Swing		

=== Assembly Election 2022 ===
2022 Manipur Legislative Assembly election: Saitu
Party	Candidate	Votes	%	±%
Independent	Haokholet Kipgen	12,456	31.52%	New
BJP	Ngamthang Haokip	9,762	24.71%	▼41.93
INC	Lamtinthang Haokip	7,133	18.05%	▼15.31
NPP	K Lhouvum	6,978	17.66%	New
Independent	Th. Sanglou Maram	2,924	7.40%	New
NOTA	None of the Above	95	0.24%	▼0.08
Margin of victory		2,694	6.82%	▼26.45
Turnout		39,512	88.42%	▼1.52
Registered electors		44,686		▲9.10
Independent gain from BJP		Swing	▼35.11	

=== Assembly By-election 2020 ===
2020 Manipur Legislative Assembly by-election: Saitu
Party	Candidate	Votes	%	±%
BJP	Ngamthang Haokip	24,549	66.63%	▲23.63
INC	Lamtinthang Haokip	12,292	33.37%	▼20.13
NOTA	None of the Above	117	0.32%	New
Margin of victory		12,257	33.27%	▲22.78
Turnout		36,841	91.54%	▲3.59
Registered electors		40,959		▼2.80
BJP gain from INC		Swing	▲13.14	

=== Assembly Election 2017 ===
2017 Manipur Legislative Assembly election: Saitu
Party	Candidate	Votes	%	±%
INC	Ngamthang Haokip	19,467	53.49%	▼2.50
BJP	Haokholet Kipgen	15,650	43.00%	New
NPF	Sehpu Haokip	1,166	3.20%	New
NOTA	None of the Above	110	0.30%	New
Margin of victory		3,817	10.49%	▼11.58
Turnout		36,393	86.36%	▲14.10
Registered electors		42,141		▲8.62
INC hold		Swing	▼2.50	

=== Assembly Election 2012 ===
2012 Manipur Legislative Assembly election: Saitu
Party	Candidate	Votes	%	±%
INC	Ngamthang Haokip	15,695	55.99%	▲12.83
NPP	Haokholet Kipgen	9,509	33.92%	New
AITC	Mairikiu John	2,456	8.76%	New
JD(U)	Semkholal Haokip	373	1.33%	New
Margin of victory		6,186	22.07%	▲11.43
Turnout		28,033	72.26%	▼12.01
Registered electors		38,795		▼0.28
INC gain from Independent		Swing	▲2.19	

=== Assembly Election 2007 ===
2007 Manipur Legislative Assembly election: Saitu
Party	Candidate	Votes	%	±%
Independent	Haokholet Kipgen	17,637	53.79%	New
INC	Ngamthang Haokip	14,150	43.16%	▲0.23
RJD	Semkholal Haokip	564	1.72%	New
BJP	Mangshi (Rose Mangshi Haokip)	435	1.33%	▲0.70
Margin of victory		3,487	10.64%	▼6.05
Turnout		32,786	84.27%	▼11.80
Registered electors		38,904		▲17.35
Independent gain from INC		Swing	▲10.86	

=== Assembly Election 2002 ===
2002 Manipur Legislative Assembly election: Saitu
Party	Candidate	Votes	%	±%
INC	Ngamthang Haokip	13,675	42.93%	▲40.53
SAP	Haokholet Kipgen	8,359	26.24%	New
FPM	Paseh	8,343	26.19%	▼21.69
MSCP	L. Haopu Haokip	658	2.07%	▼45.21
NCP	Roingam Thanga	269	0.84%	New
BJP	Jamngam Haokip	200	0.63%	New
Margin of victory		5,316	16.69%	▲16.08
Turnout		31,853	96.08%	▼0.13
Registered electors		33,153		▲4.76
INC gain from FPM		Swing	▼4.95	

=== Assembly Election 2000 ===
2000 Manipur Legislative Assembly election: Saitu
Party	Candidate	Votes	%	±%
FPM	Haokholet Kipgen	14,580	47.89%	New
MSCP	Ngamthang Haokip	14,394	47.28%	New
INC	Bonthaolung Panmei	731	2.40%	▼6.26
MPP	Helkholun (Vomboi) Hangsing	372	1.22%	▼36.91
Margin of victory		186	0.61%	▼8.75
Turnout		30,447	96.21%	▲0.12
Registered electors		31,647		▲19.79
FPM gain from MPP		Swing	▲9.75	

=== Assembly Election 1995 ===
1995 Manipur Legislative Assembly election: Saitu
Party	Candidate	Votes	%	±%
MPP	Ngamthang Haokip	9,680	38.13%	▼1.98
Independent	Alar Thoitak	7,303	28.77%	New
JD	Haokholet Kipgen	5,765	22.71%	▲16.30
INC	Paokhosei Kipgen	2,199	8.66%	▼23.69
Margin of victory		2,377	9.36%	▲1.60
Turnout		25,384	96.09%	▲1.27
Registered electors		26,418		▲18.67
MPP hold		Swing	▼1.98	

=== Assembly Election 1990 ===
1990 Manipur Legislative Assembly election: Saitu
Party	Candidate	Votes	%	±%
MPP	Ngamthang Haokip	8,468	40.12%	New
INC	S. L. Paokhosei	6,829	32.35%	▲5.92
INS(SCS)	Sh. Kaipingeou	3,146	14.90%	New
JD	Amu Kamei	1,353	6.41%	New
KNA	Jampao Haokip	715	3.39%	▼16.94
Independent	Rapuba	319	1.51%	New
Margin of victory		1,639	7.76%	▲1.66
Turnout		21,108	94.82%	▲2.73
Registered electors		22,262		▲5.32
MPP gain from INC		Swing	▲13.68	

=== Assembly Election 1984 ===
1984 Manipur Legislative Assembly election: Saitu
Party	Candidate	Votes	%	±%
INC	S. L. Paokhosei	5,146	26.44%	New
KNA	Jampao Haokip	3,957	20.33%	▲8.00
Independent	L. S. John	2,974	15.28%	New
Independent	Zampu	2,200	11.30%	New
Independent	Khangba Anth	2,090	10.74%	New
Independent	Alar Thoitak	2,076	10.67%	New
Independent	Haokholet Kipgen	574	2.95%	New
Independent	Thangkhanpao	117	0.60%	New
Margin of victory		1,189	6.11%	▲5.29
Turnout		19,465	92.09%	▲7.26
Registered electors		21,138		▲23.26
INC gain from Independent		Swing	▲8.46	

=== Assembly Election 1980 ===
1980 Manipur Legislative Assembly election: Saitu
Party	Candidate	Votes	%	±%
Independent	L. S. John	2,615	17.98%	New
JP	Althing	2,496	17.16%	New
INC(U)	Paokhosei Kipgen	2,334	16.04%	New
INC(I)	Zampu	2,122	14.59%	New
KNA	Jampao Haokip	1,793	12.33%	▼8.16
Independent	R. K. Rongsubou	1,134	7.80%	New
MPP	Ngulkholam	873	6.00%	New
Independent	Seilkholal	713	4.90%	New
Margin of victory		119	0.82%	▲0.72
Turnout		14,547	84.83%	▲4.62
Registered electors		17,149		▲14.62
Independent gain from KNA		Swing	▼2.51	

=== Assembly Election 1974 ===
1974 Manipur Legislative Assembly election: Saitu
Party	Candidate	Votes	%	±%
KNA	Zampu	2,458	20.48%	New
INC	Paokhosei Kipgen	2,446	20.38%	▲4.03
Independent	S. Punsi	2,297	19.14%	New
Independent	Seikhohao	1,252	10.43%	New
Independent	Paolen	1,142	9.52%	New
Independent	Shompa	1,027	8.56%	New
Manipur Hills Union	Jampao Haokip	637	5.31%	New
Independent	Khotinthang	343	2.86%	New
Independent	David	194	1.62%	New
Margin of victory		12	0.10%	▼2.21
Turnout		12,000	80.21%	▲16.23
Registered electors		14,961		▲27.87
KNA gain from INC		Swing	▲4.13	

=== Assembly Election 1972 ===
1972 Manipur Legislative Assembly election: Saitu
Party	Candidate	Votes	%	±%
INC	Paolen	1,224	16.35%	New
Independent	Seikhohao	1,051	14.04%	New
Independent	Seikhohao	842	11.25%	New
MPP	Demjailam	835	11.16%	New
Independent	Lamkhopao	738	9.86%	New
Independent	Padkhothang Misao	713	9.53%	New
Independent	Shompa	617	8.24%	New
Independent	Ngamkhohen Kipgem	332	4.44%	New
Socialist Party (India)	Leirengjao	318	4.25%	New
Independent	Phenrikeo	301	4.02%	New
Independent	Joukho Hmar	128	1.71%	New
Margin of victory		173	2.31%	
Turnout		7,485	63.97%	
Registered electors		11,700		
INC win (new seat)				

== See also ==
- List of constituencies of the Manipur Legislative Assembly
- Senapati district
