= Sapam Nishikant Singh =

Indian politician

Member of the Manipur Legislative Assembly

Sapam Nishikant Singh (born in 1965) is an Indian politician from Manipur. He is a MLA from Keishamthong Assembly constituency in Imphal West District. He won the 2022 Manipur Legislative Assembly election, as an independent politician, and then pledged support to the Bharatiya Janata Party government.

== Early life and education ==
Singh is from Keishamthong, Imphal West District, Manipur. He is the son of the late Sapam Mani Singh. He completed his B.Com. (Honours) in 1987 at Sriram College of Commerce, which is affiliated with Delhi University. He is one of the richest candidates in the Manipur Legislative Assembly according to the self-declared affidavit published by the Election Commission of India. He is the publisher of The Sangai Express newspaper.

== Career ==
Singh won from Keishamthong Assembly constituency as an independent politician in the 2022 Manipur Legislative Assembly election. He polled 8,874 votes and defeated his nearest rival, Maheshwar Thounaojam of the Republican Party of India (Athawale), by a margin of 187 votes. In 2019, he joined the BJP but was denied a ticket for the 2022 Assembly election and he contested as an independent candidate and won. He pledged that he would not take any salary and would contribute his salary to Local Area Development funds.
