= North East India Development Party =

- Abbreviation: NEIDP
- Founded: 2015
- Headquarters: Imphal, Manipur
- Ideology: Regionalism

The North East India Development Party (NEIDP) is a regional North-East-centric political party primarily based in Manipur (India). It was formed on 23 December 2015 and registered with the Election Commission of India.

== History ==
North East India Development Party (NEIDP) was founded by Shri Narengbam Samarjit Singh.

The registered head office of the party is at Sagolband Tera Loukrakpam Leikai, Imphal West – 795001, Manipur, India. The flag of NEIDP is of white background with 7 (seven) colours of stars (black, red, white, blue, yellow, green and violet) arranged in numerical 8 (eight) shape in the middle of the flag.

== Objective of The Party ==
• North East India Development Party is a political organization.

== Symbolic meaning and significance of the flag ==
• White background stands for TRUTH.

• Number of STARS stand for North East Region of our country namely Seven Sisters.

• Numerical figure 8 (eight) shape stands for unity amongst the stars and the colours.

• Seven colours stands for the natural gift bestowed to the Seven Sisters.

== Commitment ==
Achieving all round development through social revolution, economy revolution and political revolution within 20 years in Manipur as well as in whole north east region.

== Functionaries of the Party ==
With the gaining of the party's popularity, there is a constant upgradation. Some of the functionaries of the party are mentioned below.

• Shri Narengbam Samarjit

• Shri Elangbam Brojendro

• Shri Narengbam Biswarjit Singh

• Shri Doukhomang Khongsai

• Shri Takhelchangbam Ravi Sharma

• Shri Meinam Somorjit

• Shri Wahengbam Khelindra

• Shri Yumlembam Brogendro

• Shri Akhoijam Deepanand

• Tourangbam Tikendra Singh

• Shri Mayanglambam Tolenjao

• Shri Koijam Rosan

• Shri Tayenjam Sadananda

• Shri Takhellambam Tomba

• Shri Chingtham Shyamson

• Shrimati Leishangthem Sumila

• Shrimati Haobijam Sumila

• Shrimati Laimayum Binaka

• Shri Maibam Soto

• Shri Premjit Ngairangbam

== NEIDP in the 2017 Manipur Legislative Assembly Election ==
NEIDP projected 13 candidates out of the total 60 seats of the Manipur Legislative Assembly however the party did not win any seat. Considering the youngness of the party which was established in 2015, the performance of the party was viewed by many as the party with potential. It secured a total of 56,185 popular votes which is 3.4% from the 13 candidates. Below are the candidates of NEIDP with their statistics.

Sl.No	Candidate name	Constituency name	Votes polled	Margin with the winner
1	Sapam Kunjakeswor Singh	Patsoi	13291	114
2	Yumnam Nabachandra Singh	Wangkhem	8413	2880
3	Paukhansuan Khuptong	Churachandpur	6411	3835
4	Mayengbam Ranjit Singh	Wabgai	5264	7210
5	Thongram Gopen	Keirao	4477	1482
6	Doukhomang Khongsai	Saikul	4008	4669
7	Phijam Pakchao Singh	Lamsang	3956	8637
8	Oinam Malesh Singh	Naoriya pakhanglakpa	3610	4999
9	A.Biren Singh	Jiribam	2812	5377
10	Ningombam Nilakumar Singh	Langthabal	2806	6819
11	Potsangbam Dhanakumar Singh	Keishamthong	611	9389
12	Sheikh Kheiruddin	Lilong	369	10396
13	N.K. Shimray	Chingai	157	16425

== 2019 Lok Sabha Election ==
Candidates for Manipur

Inner Manipur (Lok Sabha constituency): R.K. Anand

Outer Manipur (Lok Sabha constituency): Ashang Kasar
