= 1957 Manipur Territorial Council election =

Election in Manipur, India

Elections to the Manipur Territorial Council were held between 25 February and 11 March 1957. It was the first council election since the merger of Manipur with the Indian Union. The election produced a fractured outcome in which the Indian National Congress became the largest party but without holding a majority in the council. Eventually the Congress could obtain a majority of seats due to migration of Independent council members into the party fold.

== Background ==
After Manipur merged with the Indian Union in 1949, it became a 'Part C' state without a legislature under the 1950 Constitution. In 1954 there was a mass protest movement in Manipur demanding an elected state government. With the passing of the States Reorganisation Act, 1956 Manipur was upgraded to Union Territory on 1 November 1956, to be administered by a Chief Commissioner and a Territorial Council. The provisions for the Territorial Council election was set out in the Union Territorial Council Act, 1956, passed by the Indian parliament.

== Electoral system and preparations ==
The Manipur Territorial Council election took place alongside the 1957 Lok Sabha (parliament) election. Voting took place on 25 February, 2 March and 11 March 1957. Per the Union Territorial Council Act, 1956 the Manipur Territorial Council would have 30 elected members and 2 members nominated by the Government of India. There would be 30 geographic constituencies electing a single member each – the Valley would have 20 seats and the Hills 10 seats. There was no reservation of seats for Scheduled Castes and Scheduled Tribes. The electorate consisted of 330,211 registered voters – 161,337 men and 168,874 women. Four parties contested the election – the Indian National Congress, the Socialist Party, the Communist Party of India and the Praja Socialist Party. There was also a large cohort of independent candidates in the fray. All in all, 148 candidates contested the election.

== Result ==
Party	Valley		Hills		Total			
Party	Candidates	Seats won	Candidates	Seats won	Candidates	Seats won	Votes	%
Indian National Congress	20	9	10	3	30	12	48,771	28.01%
Socialist Party	18	5	5	2	23	7	34,566	19.87%
Communist Party of India	16	4	1	0	17	4	19,840	11.40%
Praja Socialist Party	20	0	1	0	21	0	10,076	5.78%
Independents	38	2	19	5	57	7	60,834	34.94%

There were only 85 invalid votes cast. The highest number of votes polled was that of the Socialist Party candidate Laisram Achaw Singh in the Wangkhei-Kongba constituency, who obtained 4,667 votes (45.22%). In parallel to the Territorial Council election, Laisram Achaw Singh also contested the Inner Manipur Lok Sabha seat and was elected to Parliament. The smallest number of votes of any winning candidate was that of the Congress candidate in the Hiyanglam-Sugnoo constituency (956 votes). Among the 148 candidates there was a single woman, CPI candidate T. Sabi Devi in the Wangkhei-Kongba constituency. T. Sabi Devi was a resident of Wangkhei Ningthem Pukhri Mapal and had been a prominent leader of the 1939 Nupi Lal women's movement. She was one of five candidates in the fray in the constituency, but lost her deposit having received 482 votes (4.67%).

== Elected members ==
Manipur Territorial Council members elected in 1957
No.	Constituency	Member	Party (Note: In 1957 the Socialist Party had not been able to register with the Election Commission of India, and contested general elections across India as Independents. As of 1959–1960 the strength of parties in the Manipur Territorial Council was reported as Congress 17, Socialist 6, Communist 4 and Independents 3. Six of the seven Socialists elected in 1957 can be identified by the 1959–1960 Times of India Directory. And as outlined in the table below, five members elected as Independents in 1957 (including one Valley socialist member) had joined the Congress by 1959–1960 whilst two Congress members had become Independents.)	Region	Geographic area of the constituency
1.	Khurai	Kongbrailatpam Borthakur Sarma	Socialist	Valley	Circle IV of Imphal pana of East Imphal tahsil
2.	Wangkhei-Kongba	Laisram Achaw Singh (Note: Socialist Party leader Laisram Achaw Singh was also elected to the Lok Sabha in the 1957 election, representing the Inner Manipur constituency. India, a Reference Annual 1959 lists the Wangkhei-Kongba seat as 'vacant'. The Times of India Directory And Year Book Including Who's Who 1959–60 lists the socialist Thokchom Angou Singh as the member from Wangkhei-Kongba.)	Socialist	Valley	Circle III of Imphal pana of East Imphal tahsil
3.	Irinbung-Yairipok-Top Chingtha	Muhammad Amzed Ali	Congress	Valley	Circle III and V of Khabam pana of East Imphal tahsil
4.	Lamlai-Keirao	Tongbram Kundo Singh	Communist	Valley	Circle II and IV of Khabam pana of East Imphal tahsil
5.	Sagolmang	Athokpam Thabi Singh	Communist	Valley	Circle I of Khabam pana and Circle I of Naharup pana of East Imphal tahsil, as well as various Hill villages (Note: The Hill villages included in the Sagolmang constituency were Sadanlonga, Makokching, Purum, Khullen, Maibung, Wakan, Lanching, Khamenlok, Khongbal, Tangkhul, Chingmang Maring Tongba, Khangbal Khongjai, Tongkoi, Thayong Chanung, Laikot, Laikot Kom and Khunou, Monoi, Waichei, Waichei Sadar, Samusong, Chingdai Khullen and Khunou, Thangkal Keirao, Thangkal Thanglenba, Makokching Sadu Koireng, Makokching, Sadang Thangkul, Sadangkhonja, Machot, Khuman, Makeng Nganek, Makeng Moloikan, Makeng Nguljadou, Makeng Chinaba, Phaikon, Songbem, Saikul, Aimol Chengjapao, Angom Patong, Laphurak, Sellam Ching, Henjang, Hlongenin, Hongsum, Kangpokpi (v. number 112 including Toribari, Kalapahar and Keithelmanbi), Kangpokpi (v. number 114), Keithelmanbi Military Colony, Thumnoupokpi, Songbem-Helkhotbang, Tumuyon Khunou, Tokpa Kacha Naga, Haipi Kuki, Longphou Bongmel, Sajor-Kangpokpi, Tuyang Kipgen, Heinoupokpi, Kangpokpo Mission Compound, Kangpokpi Forest, Tumayon Khullen, Changounbung, Hengbung, Mayangkhang, Maching, Tuipayang, Hengjang, Motbung Saitu Naga, Leilon Waiphei, Makaan Kasha Naga, Khunkhu Kiki, Khunkhu Kacha Naga, Karakhum Naga, Buhpi, Phoipi Thengpaoo, Mapao Thanga Konsa Kacha Naga, Mapao Khullen, Mapao Christian, Aithu Mangthup, Phayang, Ngaikhokin, Khong-Jang, Haikon Kanglatongbi, Phoibi Laloon, Siroi Kanglatongpi, Thingsat, Khongnangpal Ekpal Chingkha, Charbung, Phairen Kangpokpi, Loowang Sangol, Kharam Thadoikom, Kharam Waifei, Ireng Kacha Naga, Kangchup Bangla Makheng, Kangchup Cairu, Natok Kabui, Natoi Kuki, Lamdaibung, Jukanu, Longa Koireng (Kharam), Sinam Holngam, Maha Koireng, Kharam Palel, Maringtongba, Yonga Koireng, Shinam Khaitheng, Thanling Chiru, Shintha-Pakang, Aimog Tumkhong, Wainem Kabui, Beitum, Loibon Khullen, Loibon Khunou, Tingkhai Khunou, Tingkhai Kullen, Ichum Keirak, Mongbang Khoripok, Sarbung, Phonjang, Wayang, Tulang Khunou, Joulin Thangkhup, Parengba Kabui, Charoipandongba Chiru, Charoipandongba Kabui, Nungshai Chiru, Satunmonsanba-Kabui, Satumonsamba Kuki, Nungang Kabui, Laimaton Kuki and Bungte Chiru.)
6.	Sekmai-Lamsang	Khwairakpam Chaoba Singh	Congress	Valley	Circles II, III and IV of Naharup pana of Imphal West tahsil
7.	Salam Khumbong-Konthaujam	Khoisnam Heitombi Singh	Communist	Valley	Circles V and VI of Naharup pana of Imphal West tahsil
8.	Uripok-Lalambung-Thangmeiband	Hidangmayum Dwijamani Sharma	Congress (Note: Listed as an Independent in The Times of India Directory And Year Book Including Who's Who 1959–60.)	Valley	Circle I (Part I) of Imphal pana of Imphal West tahsil
9.	Sagolband	Nongthombam Ibomcha Singh	Independent (Note: Listed as an Indian National Congress member in The Times of India Directory And Year Book Including Who's Who 1959–60.)	Valley	Circle I (Part II) of Imphal pana of Imphal West tahsil
10.	Keishamthong	Laisram Kulachandra Singh	Socialist	Valley	Circle II (Part I) of Imphal pana of Imphal West tahsil
11.	Singjamei	Thokchom Chandrasekhar Singh	Socialist	Valley	Circle II (Part II) of Imphal pana of Imphal West tahsil
12.	Wangoi-Mayang Imphal	Ningthoujam Tomchow Singh	Independent	Valley	Circles I and VI of Ahalloop pana of Imphal West tahsil
13.	Nambol-Keinou	Yumnam Yaima Singh	Congress	Valley	Circles II and III of Ahalloop pana of Bishenpur tahsil
14.	Bishenpur-Moirang	Hemam Nilamani Singh	Congress	Valley	Circles IV and V of Ahalloop pana of Bishenpur tahsil
15.	Kumbi-Thanga	Mairembam Koireng Singh	Congress	Valley	Circle VII of Ahalloop pana of Bishenpur tahsil
16.	Hiyanglam-Sugnoo	Elangbam Nadi Singh	Congress	Valley	Circle V and Hiyanglam, Wabgai, Keirak and Mayenglamjao villages of Circle IV of Laifam pana of Thoubal tahsil
17.	Kakching-Wangjing	Khundongbam Itocha Singh	Communist	Valley	Circle VII of Khabam pana and Pallel, Kakching, Mantak, Irengband and Sora villages of Laifam pana of Thoubal tahsil
18.	Charangpat-Khonjom	Sorokhaibam Chourajit Singh	Congress	Valley	Circle III of Laifam pana and Pechi, Langmeithet, Bengi, Icham Thana, Thokchom, Charangpat Mamang, Charangpat Maklang, Foudel, Hayel Loubook, Bishnu Naha and Wangkhem villages of Circle VI of Khabam pana of Thoubal tahsil
19.	Thoubal-Chandrakhong	Waikhom Nimaichand Singh	Independent	Valley	Circle II of Laifam pana and Phanjang-Khong, Ningel, Chandrakhong, Kakmayai How-Leikai, Leirongthel, Malom, Bitr, Sekmai-Khunbi, Kwarok Maring, Khudei Khunou, Khoirom, Kekru, Bamon Leikai, Sikhong, Sikhong Khunou, Ingourok, Ukhongsang and Lourembam villages of Circle VI of Khabam pana of Thoubal tahsil
20.	Lilong	Muhammad Alimuddin	Congress	Valley	Circle I of Laifam pana of Thoubal tahsil
21.	Tengnuoupal	Paokhohang (Note: Paokhohang also contested the Outer Manipur Lok Sabha seat election, in which he finished in fourth place with 16.66% of the vote.)	Independent (Note: Listed as an Indian National Congress member in The Times of India Directory And Year Book Including Who's Who 1959-60.)	Hills	Tengnoupal Circle
22.	Phaisat	Rishang Keishing (Note: Rishang also contested the Outer Manipur Lok Sabha seat election, in which he finished in third place with 21.30% of the vote.)	Socialist	Hills	The villages of the former Phaisat Circle (now merged with the Ukhrul Subdivision)
23.	Ukhrul	Ngalangzar	Congress	Hills	Ukhrul Subdivision sans the villages from the former Phaisat Circle
24.	Mao East	Ngaono Thoiso	Independent	Hills	Khamson, Ngatan, Thayang Khullen, Calam, Yanoi, Chawal, Tingsung, Changsang Changjapao, Changsang Solet, Laisang Phoong, Washangphung, Ngawar, Ngamju, Theba Khunou, Thingba Khunou, Thingba Khullen, Oinam, Purul Atongba, Purul Akutpa, Koidei Maiba, Ngari Khullen, Ngari Khunou, Ngari Khullen-X'tian, Thiwa, Khungdei Basti X'tian, Lakhamei, Shirung, Kadong, Phaibung Khullen, Phaibung Khunou, Laii, Chingmai Khullen, Chingmai Khunou, Kataphumai, Liyai, Phuba, Thongjoy, Saranamei, Tungam Khunou and Tungam Khullen villages of Mao Circle
25.	Mao West	Sibo Larho	Congress	Hills	Pudunamei, Rubunamei, Punanamei, Chawainu, Songsong, Kalinamei, Tadabi, Sajouba, Makhel Khullen, Makhel Kaibi, Chakumai, Makhan, Chawainamei Khullen, Chawainaemei Khunou, Pudong, Maram Khullen, Karong, Khongnem Phoupi, Khongnem, Khabong Chalhang, Maram, Khunou, Maram Khunou Gurkhali, Taphou Khangdebi, Taphou Kuku, Phoibung, Sadim Pukhri, Sadim Luikang, Sadim Khongjai, Sorbund, Silasi, Oklong, Kangyang, Songtun, Songlun Khunou, Leikot, Pheilenkot, Chaka, Razamei, Wilong, Sangkhongmei, Yangkhullen, Yangkhunou, Thuyeng, Tamphung and Monoilam villages of Mao Circle
26.	Aimol	Athuibo	Socialist	Hills	The villages of the former Aimol Circle (now merged with the Tamenglong Subdivision)
27.	Tamenglong	Kabipu Kabui	Independent	Hills	Tamenglong Subdivision sans the villages from the former Aimol Circle
28.	Jiri	Sinam Bijoy Singh	Congress	Hills	Jiribam Subdivision
29.	Thanlon	Vungkhom	Independent	Hills	The villages of the former Thanlon Circle (now merged with the Churachandpur Subdivision)
30.	Churachandpur	Paolen	Independent (Note: Paolen reportedly joined the Indian National Congress in 1957. Listed as an Indian National Congress member in The Times of India Directory And Year Book Including Who's Who 1959–60.)	Hills	Churachandpur Subdivision sans the villages from the former Thanlon Circle
Nominated		R.K. Muthra Devi	Congress		
Nominated		Anal Akim	Congress		

== Aftermath ==
The Manipur Territorial Council was constituted on 16 August 1957. On 2 September 1957 the Chief Commissioner P.C. Matthew nominated two women as council members – R.K. Mukhara Devi and Anal Akim. The two nominated female council members would eventually join the Indian National Congress. On 5 September 1957 the Territorial Council elected its chairman. The election of chairman was marred by the divisions in the Congress faction in the council. H. Dwijamani Deva Sharma defeated Mairembam Koireng Singh in a vote for the post of chairman. On 27 September 1957 Sharma was dismissed from the post of chairman, and Sibo Larho from the Indian National Congress was elected new chairman on 8 October 1957. The tenure of the Territorial Council elected in 1957 remained until the next Territorial Council election in 1962.
