= Jogeswar Singh Laisram =

Indian politician

Member of Parliament, Lok Sabha
- In office 1952-1957
- Succeeded by: Achaw Singh Laisram
- Constituency: Inner Manipur

Personal details
- Born: December 1912 Imphal, Manipur, British India (now in Manipur, India)
- Party: Indian National Congress
- Spouse: Rajkumari Ninisana Devi

Jogeswar Singh Laisram is an Indian politician from Manipur. He was a Member of Parliament, representing Inner Manipur in the Lok Sabha, the lower house of India's Parliament.
