= Socialist Party of India (1955) =

Socialist Party
- Leader: Ram Manohar Lohia
- Founded: 28 December 1955
- Dissolved: 29 June 1964
- Split from: Praja Socialist Party
- Merged into: Samyukta Socialist Party
- Headquarters: Hyderabad
- Newspaper: Mankind
- Youth wing: Samajwadi Yuvajan Sabha
- Labour wing: Hind Mazdoor Panchayat
- Membership: 125,000 (1964)
- Ideology: Socialism
- Political position: Left-wing
- ECI Status: National party (1962)

Election symbol
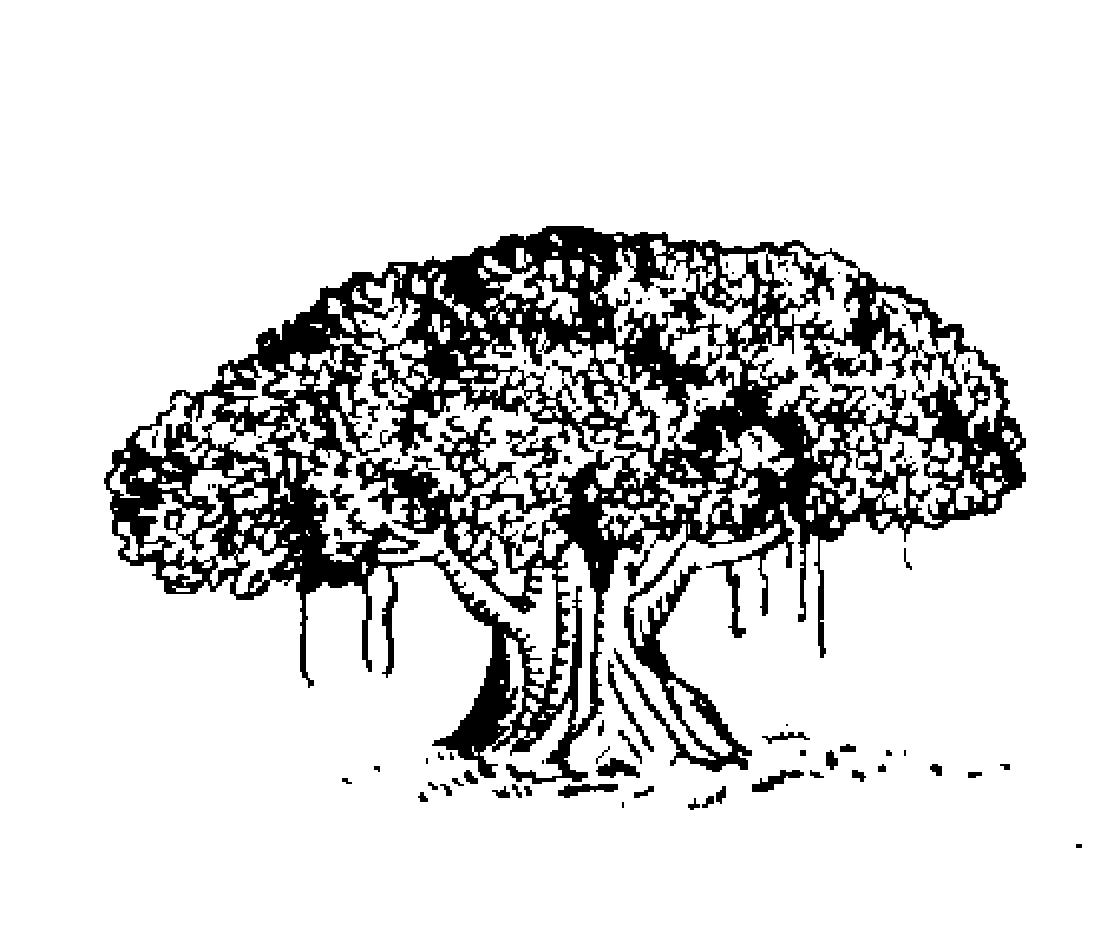

The Socialist Party of India, also known as Socialist Party (Lohia Group), the Lohia Socialists or by its Hindi language abbreviation SOPA, was a political party in India from 1955 to 1964. The party emerged out of a split in the Praja Socialist Party in 1955. The party was led by Dr. Ram Manohar Lohia, who had served as general secretary of the Praja Socialist Party. The Socialist Party had representation in the parliament of India as well in several state legislative assemblies. The strength of the party was concentrated in the Hindi belt, in particular after having suffered splits in Andhra Pradesh and Madras State 1958–1959. The Socialist Party would raise caste-related demands, breaking with socialist orthodoxy which had focused mainly on economic class issues. In 1964 a reunification with the remnants of the Praja Socialist Party took place, resulting in the formation of the Samyukta Socialist Party.

== Split in the Praja Socialist Party ==
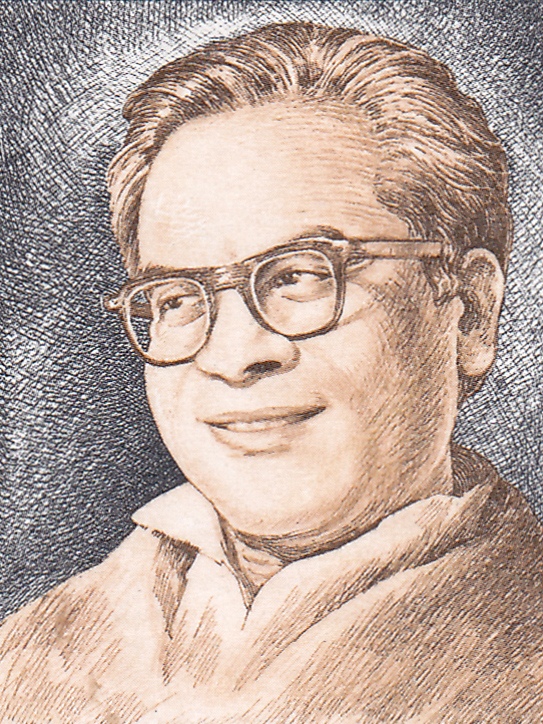
Ram Manohar Lohia in a 1997 stamp

Lohia was the general secretary of the Praja Socialist Party, but tension between him and other PSP leaders gradually grew. In March 1954 the PSP had formed a minority government in the Travancore-Cochin State led by Pattom A. Thanu Pillai, with support from the Indian National Congress. The formation of the Travancore-Cochin cabinet was preceded by differences of opinion on the approach the PSP should have taken in the state, with leaders like Lohia having preferred a leftist government whilst Jayaprakash Narayan and Asoka Mehta had initiated talks with the Congress Party. On 11 August 1954, there was an incident where police opened fire on demonstrators who were demanding a merger of Tamil-speaking areas with Madras State. In his role as PSP general secretary Lohia, at the time imprisoned at Allahabad jail, managed to send a message via telegraph ordering the local PSP unit to resign from the Travancore-Cochin government. In Lohia's words using armed violence against unarmed protestors was unacceptable for a socialist government. The PSP cabinet in Travancore-Cochin refused to follow Lohia's instruction. Other PSP leader disapproved of the action taken by Lohia on the PSP cabinet in Travancore-Cochin, and saw Lohia's instruction to the socialists in Travancore-Cochin as an act of indiscipline. Lohia resigned from his post as PSP general secretary in November 1954, in protest over the Travancore-Cochin government issue.

Another issue that had caused rifts in the party was the opposition of the PSP to the irrigation struggle in Uttar Pradesh. Lohia had been imprisoned for leading a farmers movement against the hike in rates of canal irrigation water, but the movement had not gotten support from the PSP nationwide organization. Attacks against Lohia's stances from other PSP leaders aggravated tensions, as did attacks by Lohia supporters (especially in Uttar Pradesh) against the PSP leadership.

The 1955 Avadi session of the Indian National Congress adopted a wording on socialistic pattern of social development. The adoption of socialism as principle by the Congress Party caused a heated debate within PSP. Lohia wished for a more militant approach towards the Indian National Congress government and accused fellow PSP leader Asoka Mehta of 'blur[ring] features of democratic socialism'. Lohia's grouping included Madhu Limaye, Keshav Gore, Bagaitkar and Naik Vinayak Kulkarni.

A conflict erupted in the Bombay City PSP unit, as Madhu Limaye criticized Ashoka Mehta's thesis of the 'Compulsion of backward economy'. Limaye closed PSP leaders such as Mehta of planning to join the Congress Party. The PSP Bombay City unit responded by suspended Limaye from the party for a one-year period. On 28 March 1955 Lohia stated that decision to suspend Limaye was "a grave act with possibilities of very grave consequences". The PSP National Executive Committee met in New Delhi from 9–11 April 1955. The meeting resolved to issue a warning to Lohia and others regarding their recent actions. The PSP National Executive Committee meeting endorsed the Bombay Committee's resolution whereby Limaye was suspended from party membership for one year but resolved that Limaye would be welcome back into the PSP fold if he expressed regret over his actions. At a meeting in Hyderabad on 30 May 1955 Lohia argued that the "illusion" that the Congress and the Socialists could work together was causing serious paralysis in the PSP.

The Uttar Pradesh unit of PSP, which was linked to Lohia, had invited Limaye to inaugurate the Uttar Pradesh state PSP convention. In response the PSP National Executive Committee held an emergency session in New Delhi 4–6 June 1955. The meeting noted that the party leadership had instructed the Uttar Pradesh party unit not to allow Limaye to speak at their provincial conference in Ghazipur, and in response to the defiance of the party unit in going ahead with the invitation to Limaye the PSP National Executive Committee declared the Uttar Pradesh PSP Executive suspended and formed a parallel ad hoc Uttar Pradesh PSP committee. The PSP National Executive Committee called on party members not to attend the Ghazipur conference.

On 4 June 1955, Lohia stated at a meeting in Mehboobnagar that he planned to create a new party before the end of the year, unless the PSP national leadership rectified its political line, and that he would carry out a tour across the country to mobilize support for the project. Speaking in Allahabad on 6 June 1955 Lohia stated that the PSP National Executive Committee decision to suspend the Uttar Pradesh PSP Executive was a "monstrous act of power exhibition". Limaye, when speaking at the dissident Ghazipur conference, stated the key question was whether the socialist party should be a mere instrument of the government or an independent force.

Lohia embarked on his nationwide speaking tour. On 16 June 1955 he spoke in Patna, where he said that the PSP become ineffective as an opposition force in both the national parliament as well as the state legislatures. At a press conference in Calcutta on 24 June 1955, Lohia repeated his threat of forming a new party before 31 December 1955. He argued that there was "very little scope for opposition parties to co-operate with the Government in the execution of their Five-Year Plans". On 24 June 1955, the dissident Uttar Pradesh Executive Committee concluded issued a resolution expressing full confidence in Lohia's role as the party leader and formed a nine-member Parliamentary Board for the selection of candidates for upcoming elections. On 15 July 1955, at a meeting in Bombay, Lohia repeated his demands that PSP be reformed along democratic lines.

The PSP National Executive Committee called for a meeting to be held in Jaipur, where intra-party differences could be resolved in a "cool and dispassionate manner". The meeting took place between 16 and 22 July 1955. Lohia refused to attend the Jaipur meeting. On 21 July 1955, the PSP National Executive Committee issued a resolution condemning Lohia for "undermining the prestige and organization of the party and endangering its unity and solidarity" and decided to suspend Lohia's party membership (pending an explanation from him) for "gross acts" of indiscipline and disruption. Lohia remained defiant in the face of the disciplinary measures against him. On the same day as his suspension Lohia addressed a meeting in Madurai, where he again threatened to set up his own party if the PSP national leadership would not move away from their "present impotency in fighting Governmental injustices". Lohia called on the Revolutionary Socialist Party and dissident communists to join the efforts to build a new socialist movement. The following day he spoke at a press conference in Bangalore where he affirmed that his suspension from PSP might push his grouping to "somewhat hasten their steps in forming a new party". In parallel, as the PSP National Executive Committee concluded their Jaipur meeting they called on party members to avoid raising controversies on issues like elections.

Lohia and the PSP National Executive Committee would narrate the circumstances of his departure from the party differently - Lohia claimed he had been expelled from the PSP whilst the PSP leadership would claim that he left the party on his own accord. After the suspension of Lohia from PSP his followers began setting up local party units of their own.

The feud between Lohia and the PSP National Executive Committee evoked reactions from different regional party units. On 25 July 1955 the PSP unit endorsed the decision to suspend Lohia and the Uttar Pradesh Executive from the party. The PSP Delhi State Executive issues a resolution on 27 July 1955, fiercely criticizing the suspension of Lohia. On 29 July 1955, Lohia held a press conference in New Delhi, stating that his new party would be born "not later than December 31 and probably in November". On 10 August 1955 Lohia supporters in Ludhiana announced the formation of a Socialist Party unit.

On 11 August 1955, Lohia stated in Banares that the new party would be formed within three months. On 20 August 1955 Lohia stated in Lucknow that he wished for the new party to be formed before the end of October 1955. He stated that socialist base committees and individuals would meet in five regional conferences before the end of September, leading up to an All India Party Conference. He hinted the name of the new party would probably be 'the Socialist Party of India'.

On 24 August 1955, whilst addressing the Allahabad Press Club, Lohia announced that the 'Socialist Party of India' would be constituted shortly. The following day Lohia alleged that the PSP national leadership had "fished out" an invitation from Nehru to form a Congress-PSP coalition government in 1953. The Southern Regional Convention took place on 29 August 1955, at which a resolution was adopted which called on PSP units to affiliate themselves with the new Socialist Party.

On 3 September 1955, the loyalist wing of PSP held its Uttar Pradesh state convention. At the meeting Jayaprakash Narayan denied Lohia's accusation that the PSP would seek cooperation with the government. Narayan argued that the organization being formed by Lohia would become a 'fascist party' On 16–17 September 1955,PSP dissidents from Bihar, West Bengal and Manipur held a convention, which resolved to set up state-level units to be affiliated with Lohia's Socialist Party. On 18 September 1955 PSP dissidents in Bangalore announced that they were breaking their links to the PSP National Executive Committee. On 23 September 1955, the Lohia group in Uttar Pradesh inaugurated a special convention in Kanpur. On 26 September, when speaking at the Kanpur convention, Lohia said that the socialists should start preparing themselves to seize power from the Congress government within seven years. On 9 October 1955, a special PSP convention in Vindhya Pradesh decided to break with the PSP National Executive Committee and declare its allegiance to the Lohia's Socialist Party. On 18 October 1955, some 300 protestors from Lohia's Socialist Party took to the streets in New Delhi for a 'Demands Day' rally.

On 2–3 November 1955, zonal and state-level representatives of the PSP dissidents from across India gathered for a meeting in Bhopal. The meeting decided that the new party would hold its founding conference in Hyderabad from 28 December to 3 January. In his speech at the Bhopal meeting he stated that the new Socialist Party would not look at the Congress Socialist Party, the old SP or the PSP as models for its political path ahead. He argued that all the contemporary opposition parties in India merely reacted to the actions of the Government, and called for the new Socialist Party to break with this pattern. The Bhopal meeting issued a resolution condemning the murder of a socialist activist in Barabanki on 16 October 1955, and which argued that the Uttar Pradesh state government as responsible for the act due to its failure to ensure security for the popular movements. The resolution argued that the murder constituted "the final assertion of the utter fiasco of [the Uttar Pradesh state government's] zamindari abolition policies." Another resolution adopted at Bhopal charged the government with "utter neglect" in relation to recent floods, and called for compensation to affected communities.

The Bhopal meeting also issued a resolution on the States Reorganisation Commission report, which argued that the Commission "has done no more than recommend minor changes in the existing administrative map of India [...] Some major aspirations of a long past have remained unfulfilled". The resolution accused the Congress Party government of using the states reorganisation process as a divide and rule tactic, arguing that the Commission report "has now placed the ruling party in the doubly advantageous position of, on the one hand, championing the conflicting territorial claims of different linguistic groups" whilst it had also "secured the advantage of 'setting itself up as the arbiter of those same conflicting claims." The Bhopal meeting called for unambiguous acceptance of the principle of linguistic states and asked its party units to "unfold all vigorous action, without resort to violence".

On 4 December 1955, the Western Zone socialist conference was held. The conference called for direct action in case the demand for a united Maharashtra state with Bombay as its capital had not been fulfilled by the first week of January 1956.

== Founding conference of the Socialist Party ==
As announced, the founding conference of the Socialist Party took place in Hyderabad between 28 December 1955 and 3 January 1956. The conference gathered some 1,000 participants. In his speech to the conference Lohia called for building a broad based socialist opposition party and he outlined a Seven-Year Plan to seize power in India. The new party would reject both capitalism and communism.

On 1 January 1956, the Hyderabad conference passed a resolution announcing plans to set up a "conscious, militant volunteer organisation to be named as Socialist Seva Dal". On 2 January 1956, the Hyderabad conference unanimously passed a resolution endorsing Lohia's Seven-Year Plan to Power. Moreover, the conference passed a resolution condemning the Dulles-Cunha statement on Goa. On 3 January 1956, Lohia was elected chairman of the new party. Bipin Pal Das from Assam became the founding general secretary of the party.

Representatives of the Socialist Republican Party attended the Hyderabad conference. A faction of the remnants of SRP joined Lohia's Socialist Party. In parallel to the Hyderabad conference, the PSP held its second annual conference in Gaya.

== The Lohia Socialists after the PSP split ==
The PSP had been formed in 1952 through the merger of the old Socialist Party (emerging from the Congress Socialist Party) and the Kisan Mazdoor Praja Party. The new Lohia Socialist Party was formed mainly by former members of the old Socialist Party, although there were also some former KMPP members within its ranks. Lohia's Socialist Party differed from the PSP in the role played by the party leader, as Lohia had a much more dominant role in his party compared to his post-split counterpart. Lohia's Socialist Party would focus less on economic class issues than PSP and would rather raise issues of caste and language politics. The party called for abolishing the use of English language and the tearing down of British statues, and promoted Hindi as the national link language. The Socialist Party organized agitations, civil disobedience movements, walkouts from legislative assemblies and protests from assembly floors. The youth wing of the party was known as the Samajwadi Yuvajan Sabha (SYS).

The nationwide Central Office of the Socialist Party was set up in Hyderabad. In August 1956 the party publication Mankind was launched, issued from Hyderabad. Lohia was the editor of Mankind. Around 1957 there were occasional talks of unity with the PSP, but these talks did not result in any concrete moves towards reunifications.

== Struggle for linguistic states ==
In February 1956 the party joined the Samyukta Maharashtra Samiti, the movement to create a Marathi-speaking state. In the same month, the Socialist Party protested against the proposal to merge Bihar and West Bengal into Purva Pradesh. On 5 March 1956 the National Executive Committee of the Socialist Party adopted a resolution arguing that the reorganization of states should largely be done on linguistic lines.

== Protest movements in Uttar Pradesh and Bihar ==
On 1 March 1956 the Socialist Party organized a large rally in Lucknow, gathering some 20,000 people, demanding land redistribution, administrative decentralization, introduction of old-age pensions and provision of jobs for unemployed.

On 11 June 1956 the National Executive Committee of the Socialist Party endorsed a resolution of the Bihar party unit for the launching of a civil disobedience movement. On 19 June 1956, Lohia stated in Hyderabad that the Socialist Party was open to dialogue with the Bihar Chief Minister Shri Krishna Sinha on the abolition of certain taxes. By 6 July 1956 Lohia announced at a press conference in Patna that the party would undertake a civil disobedience movement in Bihar.

On 18 July 1956 Lohia publicly rejected the statement of the Electoral Commissioner which had indicated that the Socialist Party would not be assigned an election symbol.

On 26 August 1956 SP National Executive Committee member Jagdish Joshi announced at a press conference in Allahabad the plans for a civil disobedience movement in Bihar. In September 1956 the party launched a satyagraha campaign in Bihar with 12 demands, including land to the tillers, abolition of 'oppressive and vexatious taxes', minimum wage for agricultural workers, provision of jobs for unemployed and a total remission of land revenues on profitless agriculture. On 8 September 1956, Lohia outlined in a speech at a public rally in Patna a five-year plan for spreading the civil disobedience movement across all of India.

== Suez crisis ==
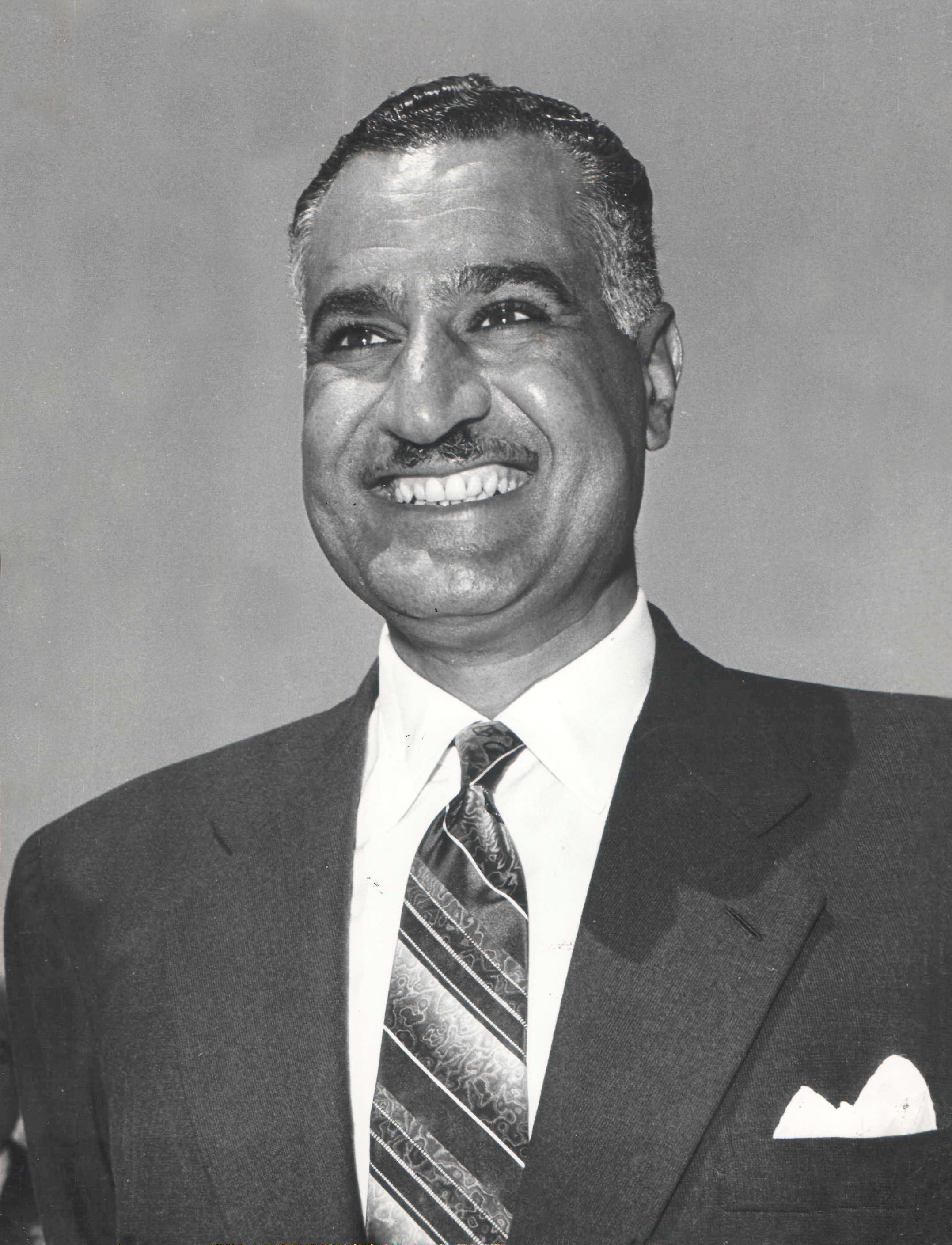
Lohia celebrated Gamal Abdel Nasser's nationalization of the Suez Canal.

On 28 July 1956, commenting on the nationalization of the Suez Canal by the Egyptian government at a party meeting, Lohia congratulated Gamal Abdel Nasser and stated that the move marked the beginning of a 'new epoch of economic equality among the nations of the world'. There were press reports that the Socialist Party was considering setting up an Asian Brigade of volunteers to defend Egypt against attacks from the West. At a 30 July 1956 Hyderabad press conference Lohia stated that India should follow the path laid out by Egypt on the Suez Canal issue and nationalize Indian resources exploited by foreign businesses. The SP National Executive Committee meeting of the Socialist Party held in Nagpur on 20 September 1956 endorsed support for the Egyptian stance on the Suez Canal issue.

== Prahlad Nagar conference ==
The Socialist Party held its annual conference in Prahlad Nagar, Madhya Pradesh, in late December 1956. With a resolution adopted on 31 December 1956 the Prahlad Nagar conference finally cemented the position that the Socialist Party would contest the upcoming elections on its own without any electoral alliances with other parties, and rejected the notion of negotiations for seat sharing before elections. In a separate resolution, the Prahlad Nagar conference called for both collective and individual satyagraha against 'disorders and totalitarian tendencies' in the country. A resolution on international issues called for a break with the Commonwealth. The resolution stated that in order "[t]o attain a people to people relationship, a instead of a Government to Government relationship, would be step towards socialist civilisation. Only through demolishing national boundaries with an indomitable faith in fraternity, equality and non-violence, will mankind be able to create a new world for itself."

== 1957 elections ==
In the 1952 Indian general election the original Socialist Party had a Tree as its election symbol whilst the Kisan Mazdoor Praja Party election symbol had been a Hut. After the merger of these two parties, the PSP had adopted the Hut as its election symbol. In the lead-up to the 1957 Indian general election Lohia's Socialist Party requested recognition from the Election Commission of India and claimed the Tree election symbol. According to the Socialist Party it organized members of parliament and legislative assemblies, who had represented three percent of valid votes cast in past elections. The Election Commission rejected this logic and did not grant the Tree to Lohia's Socialist Party. The Lohia Socialists appealed against the Election Commission decision at the High Court, but without any success. Thus the party had to contest the 1957 elections as independents without a dedicated symbol for the party.

The party adopted a 'purist' approach to the election, rejecting any pre-electoral alliances with other parties. The approach of the party was diametrical opposite of the PSP, which attempted to form pre-electoral pacts from both left and right.

The party contested 33 Lok Sabha and 335 state legislative seats, and would win 9 Lok Sabha seats and 52 state legislative seats. The party candidates obtained an estimated 1.3-1.5 million votes in the parliamentary election. In Uttar Pradesh alone, there were some 130 Socialist Party candidates. In the Lok Sabha election in Uttar Pradesh the party got some 5.67% of the votes in the state.

Socialist Party Lok Sabha parliamentarians elected in 1957 were P.V.G. Raju (Visakhapatnam), Dippala Suri Dora (Parvathipuram), S.C.C. Anthony Pillai (Madras North), Braj Raj Singh (Firozabad), Arjun Singh (Etawah), Jagdish Awasthi (Bilhaur), Shibban Lal Saxena (Maharajganj), Ram Sewak Yadav (Barabanki) and Achaw Singh Laisram (Inner Manipur). The party would hold 16 seats in the Andhra Pradesh Legislative Assembly, 2 seats in the Bihar Legislative Assembly, 6 seats in the Madhya Pradesh Legislative Assembly, 2 seats in the Madras Legislative Assembly, 1 seat in the Orissa Legislative Assembly and 25 seats in the Uttar Pradesh Legislative Assembly. Lohia contested the Chandauli Lok Sabha seat, finishing in second place with 97,911 votes (42.13%).

The Socialist Party contested 23 out of a total of 30 seats in the 1957 Manipur Territorial Council election, as well as contesting both Lok Sabha seats. The party won 7 seats in the Manipur Territorial Council. Whilst the socialist candidate Laisram Achaw Singh won the Inner Manipur seat the incumbent socialist member in the Outer Manipur constituency, Rishang Keishing, finished in third place with 17,307 votes (21.30%) and lost his seat.

== Punjab ==
When the PSP was divided, Dr. Krishan sided with Lohia. When the Socialist Party was formed Dr. Krishan became the secretary of the Punjab branch and Mani Ram Bagri the chairman. Dr. Krishan was an active leader of the party between 1955 and 1957, and was arrested in Chandigarh in connection with the Sirsa agitation. The party had some influence among agricultural labourers and Harijans, as well as having some pockets of support in the Hindi-speaking region.

In the 1957 Punjab Legislative Assembly election the Socialist Party contested seven constituencies in the Mahindergarh District and the Hissar District, as well as one constituency in Patiala District. The party got some 1.38% of the votes in the state, but managed to win seats as its vote was concentrated into a handful of constituencies. The party received support from powerful individuals who were not necessarily socialist sympathizers but who appreciated the anti-Congress approach of the party.

== 1857 uprising centenary commemoration ==
In 1957 there was an unusual unity of leftist forces in Uttar Pradesh, as Communist Party of India (CPI), PSP and SP joined hands in protests linked to the centenary commemoration of the 1857 War of Independence. In Banaras the statue of Queen Victoria was torn down. In Etawah demonstrators renamed the Victoria Hall after the Rani of Jhansi.

== Shergati conference ==
The Socialist Party held its annual conference in Shergati near Gaya on 26–27 April 1958. Some 200 delegates attended the event, representing some 100,000 party members across the country. At the Shergati conference internal dissident was manifested, with a minority challenging the dominance of Lohia over the party. Whilst the main political issue debated was a potential merger process with PSP, there were also criticisms on Lohia's style of leadership. A pamphlet was circulated at the conference which denounced that a personality cult had been formed around Lohia.

On 26 April 1958 party chairman Gopal Narain Saxena outlined a five-point program in his presidential address. Saxena called for demanding improved relief measures and remission of rent in famine pockets, abolishing all use of English language, elimination of corruption, tax and land revenue relief for agriculturists and an effort to build a party organization. Saxena highlighted the abolition of the zamindari system, and stressed that the Socialist Party had been the first group to raise that demand. Lohia addressed the Shergati conference the following day. He charged the Congress Party government with being guilty of "bungling , nepotism and corruption", arguing that the government was "corrupt from top to bottom". He argued that the Socialist Party was the sole political actor in India that was "devoting equal attention to the problems of the belly and of the mind". Lohia also raise the language issue in his speech, calling for a boycott of English language and called upon students to refuse to allow English language teaching below the tenth class.

The main topic for debate at Shergati was the question on a reunification with PSP. In mid-April the Andhra Pradesh Socialist Party unit conference of the endorsed plans for 'broad-based socialist unity'. At the Uttar Pradesh Party Conference in Unnao calls for a merger had been raised by participants. At the Shergati conference P.V.G. Raju (head of the party in Andhra Pradesh and leader of the parliamentary group of the party) advocated for a merger. Another pro-merger voice was the party general secretary Bipin Pal Das. However the resolution adopted by the Shergati conference on 27 April 1958 rejected the proposal to re-open the merger issue. The Shergati conference reaffirmed that in order for a unity process with PSP to move ahead, PSP would first have to accept the Socialist Party Statement of Principles, Program and Constitution. Moreover the Shergati conference resolution disapproved of Socialist Party representatives in Parliament attempting to join the proposed United Democratic Socialist bloc. The official party resolution was moved by Limaye as chairman of the Maharashtra party unit, and it was seconded by the Bihar party unit chairman Bhupendra Narain Mandal. The amendment to the resolution, moved by the dissidents, was defeated in a 115 to 24 vote.

The Shergati conference also softened the Party Constitution. Member criteria were changed, and party members would no longer be required to spend 14 hours weekly to be considered as active members. The previous condition of minimum three months party membership before being eligible to be elected to party committees was removed. A proposed amendment, which would have made participation of legislators, provincial committee and district committee members in agitations mandatory, was voted down (there had been negative experiences with recent satyagraha movements in Uttar Pradesh, when many socialist legislators had come up with excuses not to take part in the protests).

On 28 April 1958 a new party leadership was elected. There were two candidates for the post as party chairman - Madhu Limaye, who won the election with 170 votes, and Mahadeo Singh from Andhra Pradesh who obtained 46 votes. The new National Executive Committee of the Socialist Party consisted of Shamshi Minai, Tika Ram, Natha Rawat, Khalilur Rahman, Raj Narain, Bhupendra Narain Mandal, Ram Lakhan Chandapuri, Shadasiv Bagedutkar, Baleshwajordar, Dinesh Gupta, B.L. Sabhapati, Shambhu Murti, R.M. Mankilat, Dorai Babu, Gopal Barbara, Ram Kishun, Ram Peyare Sharma, Mirnal Gore and Saraswati Ammal.

A significant section of the Socialist Party broke away following the outcome of the Shergati conference. P.V.G. Raju resigned from the post as leader of the parliamentary group. Bipin Pal Das resigned from the post as party general secretary. Bipin Pal Das accused Lohia having violated the Constitution of the party and that Lohia had promoted 'gangsterism' within the party ranks in an effort to suppress internal dissent at the conference. The Lohia leadership was accused of having secured a majority at Shergati by the enrolling of bogus party members. Das decried Lohia for "autocracy, arrogance and whimsicality", arguing that Lohia himself posed the largest threat to the well-being of the party. Playing on rumours of a secret party treasury, Das had argued at the conference that financial issues posed a threat to the party. P.V.G. Raju alleged at the Shergati conference that the party publication Mankind was financed by a Hyderabad millionaire and that Lohia had fired three editors of Mankind they had not published an open letter of Lohia to the Minister of Prisons of Uttar Pradesh. After the Shergati conference P.V.G. Raju and 14 other party leaders issued a statement accusing the party of "developing personal leadership, a personality cult, casteism, provincialism and, further, of misusing the party's fund".

== December 1958–January 1959 protest movements ==
On 1 December 1958 the Rajasthan unit of the Socialist Party initiated a satyagraha movement, based an 21 demands sent to the Chief Minister on 7 October 1958. The demands of the protest movement included lowering tax burden for farmers, relief for unemployed, abolition of land revenue for unprofitable agriculture and actions to eradicate corruption in public service. On 10 December 1958 a Socialist Party activist was arrested in Patna for vandalizing the statue of British Viceroy Charles Hardinge. The following day Bhupendra Narain Mandal defended the act in the Bihar Legislative Assembly and called for the removal British Imperial monuments. On 1 January 1959 the party launched a civil disobedience movement in Punjab. Party chairman Limaye was arrested in Hissar on 7 January 1959 in connection with a protest against high food prices. On 15 January 1959 the Socialist Party launched a civil disobedience movement in Madhya Pradesh.

== 1959 Chandauli by-election ==
In early February 1959 Socialist Party candidate Prabhu Narain Singh won a by-election for the Chandauli Lok Sabha constituency seat. He obtained 104,133 votes (50.4%). Chandauli was the seat contested by Lohia in 1957 and when the by-election was announced Lohia declared that we would stand as the Socialist Party candidate. But on the last date of filing nominations, 15 December 1958, he had not yet done so. On 15 December 1959 party chairman Limaye stated that a decision had been reached three days earlier that Lohia would not be the candidate of the party. Lohia undertook a 15-day tour of the constituency to campaign for Singh. In his campaign speeches for the Chandauli by-election Lohia argued that the Congress Party had become 'corrupt beyond redemption'.

== Reservation policy ==
Lohia began articulating criticisms of Brahim domination in the Congress Party and the 'Hindustani Left'. In 1959 the Socialist Party adopted a resolution, whereby the party committed to fighting for 60% of posts in government services, political parties and the military for Shudras, Harijans, Scheduled tribes, religious minorities and women. However, this line was met with resistance from party leaders in Bihar who saw the shift from class issues to caste issues as retrograde. In April 1961 the party publicly committed to nominating 60% of their candidates for the 1962 election would come from the ranks of Shudras, Harijans, Scheduled tribes, religious minorities and women. The party slogan sopa ne bandhi ganth, pichhde paavein sau mein saath (सोपा ने बांधी गांठ, पिछड़े पावें सौ में साठ, 'SOPA [Socialist Party] tied the knot, backward people will get sixty percent out of hundred') gradually gained momentum in Uttar Pradesh and Bihar.

== Splits in South India ==
In Andhra State the dominant section of PSP, led by P.V.G. Raju (Maharaja of Vijayanagaram), sided with Lohia in the 1955 party split. There had been a conflict between P.V.G. Raju and Tenneti Viswanadham over the control of the Andhra PSP unit. Other leaders of the Andhra Lohia Socialists included Gautam Rao, Badrivishal Pitti, Chakradhar and G. Rajaram. All 13 state legislators elected in the 1955 Andhra State Legislative Assembly election joined Lohia's Socialist Party in the split.

With the merger of Andhra State and Hyderabad State into Andhra Pradesh, the Socialist Party units merged as well. P.V.G. Raju became the party leader in the state legislature, Rajaram served as the deputy leader of the legislative faction and Ratnasabhapathy served as the secretary. The party mustered some 529,000 votes in the 1957 Indian general election in Andhra Pradesh.

After the 1957 elections tensions grew between P.V.G. Raju and the Socialist Party national leadership, leading to the disaffiliation of the Andhra Pradesh unit from the party. In 1959 the P.V.G. Raju group merged with the Democratic Party, forming the Socialist Democratic Party.

Another split occurred in early 1959 in Madras State, as S.C.C. Anthony Pillai and his followers broke away from the party. The S.C.C. Anthony Pillai group accused the Socialist Party of 'dictatorial tendencies'. The dissidents formed the Tamilnad Socialist Labour Party in April 1959.

== 1960 Kerala election ==
The Socialist Party had not contested the 1957 Kerala Legislative Assembly election, but it did field four candidates in the 1960 Kerala Legislative Assembly election. The Socialist Party candidate in the Kuthuparamba constituency, K.K. Aboo, was supported by the Communist Party of India. K.K. Aboo finished in second place with 18,691 votes (30.63%). All the remaining Socialist Party candidates forfeited their deposits, Paul V Kunnil got 748 votes (1.41%) in Ramamangalam, M.A. Augustine got 267 votes (0.55%) in Thodupuzha and Ramankutty Menon got 1,595 votes in Wadakkancherry (two-member constituency).

== Trade union movement ==
After the PSP-SP party split in 1955, the Lohia Socialists continued to work within the socialist trade union centre Hind Mazdoor Sabha (HMS). But in 1959 some SP-led trade unions in Bombay were disaffiliated from HMS due to non-payment of union dues. In 1962 the Socialist Party launched its own trade union centre, the Hind Mazdoor Panchayat (HMP). George Fernandes became the HMP general secretary.

== 1962 elections ==
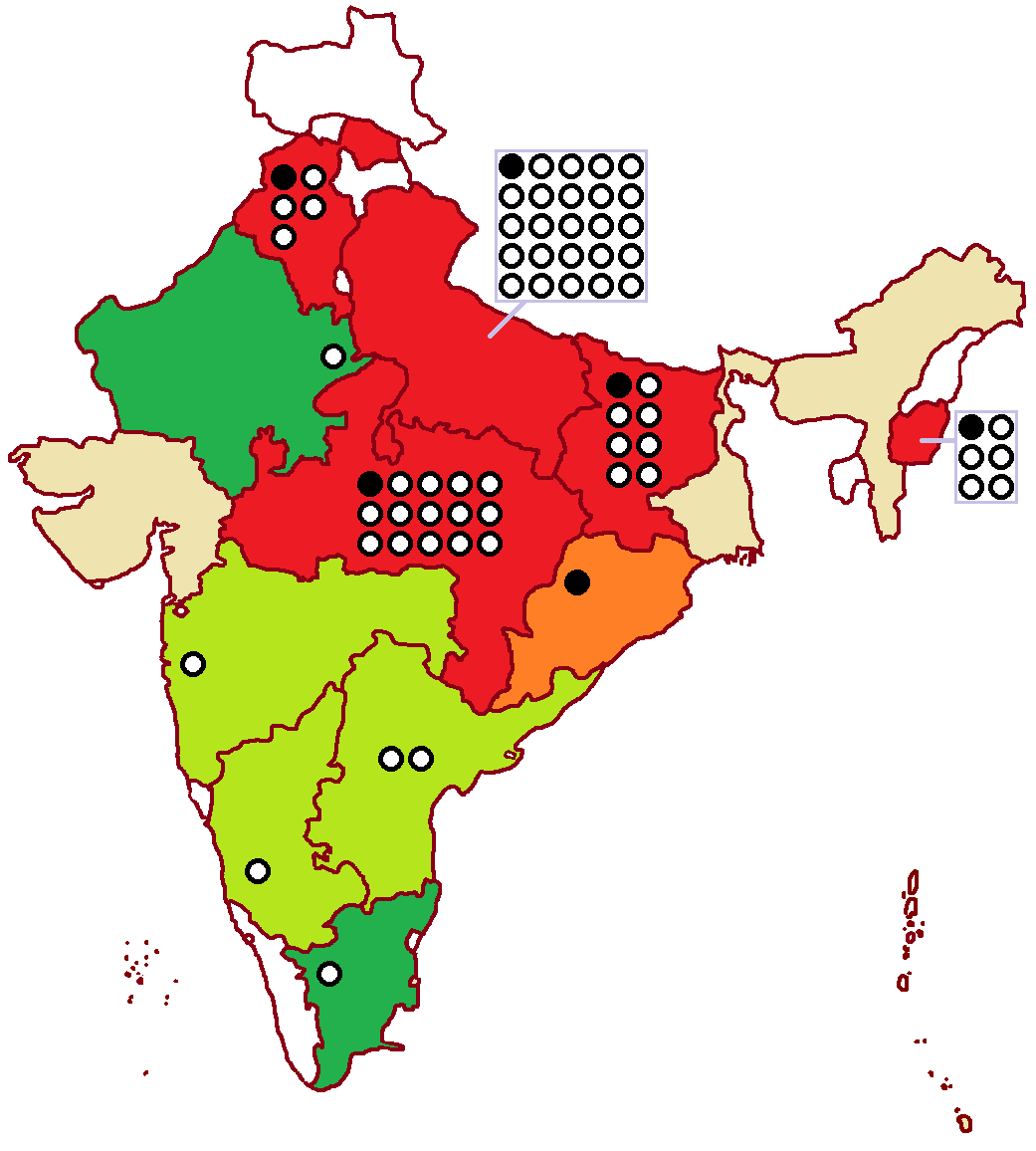
Lohia Socialists in 1962 elections. • black dot = 1 Lok Sabha seat won by SP • circle = 1 Legislative Assembly seat won by SP • red = SP contested Lok Sabha and Legislative Assembly elections, won seats in both • orange = SP contested Lok Sabha election (no Legislative Assembly election that year), won a seat • green = SP contested Lok Sabha and Legislative Assembly elections, won a seat in Legislative Assembly • light green = SP contested Legislative Assembly elections only, won seats • light pink = SP contested Lok Sabha and Legislative Assembly elections, no seats • white = SP did not contest any election in 1962

Ahead of the 1962 Indian general election the Socialist Party was able to gain recognition by the Election Commission of India as a national party and could now contest elections with the Tree ('bargad') election symbol. The Socialist Party entered the 1962 electoral campaigns again with an approach of equidistance to different political parties, seeking to contest alone without any alliances. The 1962 Socialist Party election manifesto argued that all other parties in the fray were "instruments of the English-oriented, high-caste, moneyed middle class" The manifesto called for the end to "inequality between the big man and the small man", a goal to be achieved by revolutionary struggle through satyagraha and agitations. The 1962 socialist election manifesto demanded a 60% reservation for all leading posts to women, Shudras, Harijans, Scheduled Tribes and backward classes "so long as caste differences in mind and education are not destroyed" The party demanded that inter-caste marriage be recognized as a qualification for recruitment to the public sector and that twice yearly inter-caste dining be made into a mandatory criteria for government jobs.

In the Lok Sabha election the Socialist Party presented 107 candidates, out of whom six were elected - Rishang from Outer Manipur (Manipur), Ram Sewak Yadav from Bara Banki (Uttar Pradesh), Mani Ram Bagri from Hissar (Punjab), Kishen Pattnaik from Sambalpur (Orissa), Buddhu Singh Utiya from Shahdol (ST) (Madhya Pradesh) and Bhupendra Narayan Mandal from Saharsa (Bihar). Out of the 13 states that held state legislative assembly elections in 1962, the Socialist Party contested 12 (all except Jammu-Kashmir). The party also contested the Manipur Territorial Council election, in which it won 5 seats.

Overall the outcome of the 1962 elections, like that of the 1957 elections, represented a demoralising set-back for both SP and PSP, and now the right-wing parties of Swatantra and Jan Sangh emerged as the more important opposition forces. Key individual losses for Socialist Party candidates were the defeats of sitting Lok Sabha members Raj Narain Singh (party chairman) and Braj Raj Singh (Lok Sabha group leader of the party). Lohia himself had stood as a candidate in Phulpur constituency, taking on Prime Minister Jawaharlal Nehru. Lohia finished in second place with 28.17% of the votes, against 61.62% for Nehru.

Socialist Party performance in the 1962 parliamentary and state assembly elections
State	1962 Lok Sabha election				1962 state assembly elections						
State	Candidates	Seats won	Votes	% of votes		Candidates	Seats won	Votes	% of votes	% of votes in seats contested	Reference
Andhra Pradesh					1962 Andhra Pradesh Legislative Assembly election	15	2	70,878	0.61%	12.99%	
Assam	2	0	72,006	2.89%	1962 Assam Legislative Assembly election	14	0	36,672	1.50%	12.63%	
Bihar	24	1	608,284	6.12%	1962 Bihar Legislative Assembly election	132	7	515,263	5.23%	12.29%	
Gujarat	1	0	2,581	0.05%	1962 Gujarat Legislative Assembly election	2	0	1,362	0.03%	1.72%	
Madhya Pradesh	14	1	354,595	5.29%	1962 Madhya Pradesh Legislative Assembly election	86	14	310,181	4.73%	15.66%	
Madras	2	0	45,097	0.36%	1962 Madras Legislative Assembly election	7	1	48,753	0.38%	10.51%	
Maharashtra					1962 Maharashtra Legislative Assembly election	14	1	54,764	0.50%	7.02%	
Manipur	2	1	69,586	26.3%	1962 Manipur Territorial Council election	27	5	51,546	19.44%		
Mysore					1962 Mysore Legislative Assembly election	9	1	62,809	1.00%	21.46%	
Orissa	3	1	52,633	2.67%							
Punjab	1	1	152,369	2.25%	1962 Punjab Legislative Assembly election	8	4	93,801	1.39%	26.51%	
Rajasthan	6	0	191,823	3.69%	1962 Rajasthan Legislative Assembly election	40	5	189,147	3.68%	15.74%	
Uttar Pradesh	51	1	1,546,869	8.64%	1962 Uttar Pradesh Legislative Assembly election	273	24	1,462,359	8.21%	12.74%	
West Bengal	1	0	3,554	0.04%	1962 West Bengal Legislative Assembly election	7	0	2,663	0.03%	0.98%	
Total	107	6	3,099,397	2.69%		634	64	2,900,198		13.31%	

== United Socialist Party in Uttar Pradesh ==
In Uttar Pradesh the party was its strongholds in the districts of the former Oudh kingdom. On the contrary, the party was weak in western Uttar Pradesh. Per a study by Burger (1969), among the Socialist Party legislators elected in 1962 in Uttar Pradesh 37 were Brahmin (17.1%), 38 Thakurs (17.6%), 16 Bania (7.4%), 7 Kayasths (3.2%), 6 from other elite castes (Jats, Bhumihars, etc.) (2.8%), 19 Kurmis (8.8%), 30 Yadavs (13.9%), 3 Lodhi Rajputs (1.4%), 15 Other Backward Classes (6.9%), 21 Muslims (9.7%), 17 Scheduled Castes elected from in general seats (7.9%) and 7 without ascertained caste identity (3.3%).

After the 1962 Uttar Pradesh Legislative Assembly election, some backbenchers among the Socialist Party and the Praja Socialist Praja worked to form a united socialist legislative faction. Notably after the 1962 the right-wing Jan Sangh had emerged as the second largest party in the Legislative Assembly with 49 seats, pushing the PSP and SP into third and fourth places respectively. This situation pushed the SP and PSP legislators to cooperate to form a united bloc to challenge Jan Sangh. Another issue that brought the PSP and SP legislators closer to each other was the alliance between the Congress Party and the CPI on the Uttar Pradesh Emergency Surcharge on Land Revenue and Rent Bill, combined with CPI support to the Congress Party government at the national level.

The Uttar Pradesh Socialist Party was led by Ugra Sen, who was a moderate on the merger issue. And after Genda Singh, with whom SP had a difficult relationship, resigned as the leader of PSP in Uttar Pradesh and was replaced by Balwant Singh the prospects for cooperation between the two parties improved. On 13 December 1962 the United Socialist Party group was constituted as a joint legislative faction, a move that caught both SP and PSP national executives off guard. 54 legislators took part in the meeting, which decided to set up a three-member committee to draft a policy statement that would be agreeable to both of the parties involved. SP was represented in the three-member committee by Kashinath Misra. The United Socialist Party would come to hold 59 seats in the Uttar Pradesh Legislative Assembly.

The national executive of the Socialist Party did not react positively on hearing the news from the Uttar Pradesh legislature. The party chairman Raj Narain labelled the move a violation of the Party Constitution. He sent Ram Sewak Yadav (leader of the Socialist Party group in the Lok Sabha) and G. Murahari (Socialist Party Parliamentary Board secretary) to Lucknow to investigate the issue. Upon arriving in Lucknow Murahari asked the SP legislators to renounce the United Socialist Party group, unless it adopted the SP political program. Narain was reassured by the United Socialist Party triumvirate that their committee had accepted the 1962 SP Election Manifesto as its platform for political action, and thus no disciplinary measures were enacted at this stage.

The United Socialist Party held its first general meeting on 25 December 1962 in Lucknow. The meeting resolved to work for unity between SP and PSP. The United Socialist Party would only deal with state politics, and all national-level issues would be decided by the national executives of each party respectively.

The Socialist Party National Executive Committee was divided on the question of the merger. Most members of the 15-member SP National Executive Committee agreed with talks with PSP, but a minority of 3 members opposed any moves for unity whatsoever.

The Socialist Party held its 6th National Conference in Bharatpur in late December 1962. For seventeen hours, the question of unity with PSP was debated. The resolution (adopted with 221 votes in favour, 61 votes against) gave green light to the SP National Executive Committee to proceed with a merger process with PSP if the latter accepted the Socialist Party 1962 Election Manifesto as the platform for unity. Lohia, who did not attend the Bharatpur conference, had declared that he approved of unity talks on the basis of the 1962 SP Election Manifesto, but that he himself would abstain from any of the conversations with PSP due to his old age and complicated history with the PSP leaders.

But in parallel to the national dialogues between SP and PSP, there were state-level unity talks taking place in Madhya Pradesh, Maharashtra, Bihar, Rajasthan and Punjab. The SP National Executive Committee sent out a warning to state units, threatening disciplinary actions against state units if they continue dialogues with PSP before a national merger process had been agreed upon between the two parties.

On 10 January 1963 the National Executives of SP and PSP met in New Delhi. At 10 January meeting SP demanded that PSP accept the SP 1962 Election Manifesto. PSP did not agree at the onset, but asked SP to clarify various points outlined in the SP 1962 Election Manifesto. Programmatic difficulties included language politics (SP was mainly based in Hindi belt, whilst the issue of Hindi was problematic for PSP which had more support in Southern India), reservations (PSP disapproved of the SP caste reservation policy), the right of public employees to organize themselves in political parties (PSP opposed this, SP favoured allowing public employees to be active in party politics apart from military and police officers), conflict with China, the role of intellectuals and how political parties were evaluated in the SP 1962 Election Manifesto. The PSP leaders also rejected how PSP was described in the SP 1962 Election Manifesto.

The PSP National Executive Committee held a meeting in New Delhi on 29 January 1963. The PSP National Executive Committee meeting proposed a seven-member joint committee, headed by S.M. Joshi, to oversee the unity process. The SP National Executive Committee rejected the proposition. Instead the SP National Executive Committee issued a call to PSP units to abandon their party and affiliate with SP.

In February 1963 SP chairman Raj Narain and general secretary Rabi Roy went to Lucknow, to convince the SP legislators to abandon the United Socialist Party. They managed to get a section of SP legislators to propose a motion whereby the United Socialist Party would condemn the PSP National Executive Committee. The PSP legislators rejected the proposed motion. The SP leader Ugra Sen withdrew from the United Socialist Party. Raj Narain circulated a document to sign among the SP legislators, whereby they would renounce the United Socialist Party and reaffirm that they were bound by SP party discipline. Only 8 signed Narain's document, whilst the remaining 16 SP legislators broke with the party leadership and stayed in the United Socialist Party.

== 1963 Lok Sabha by-elections ==
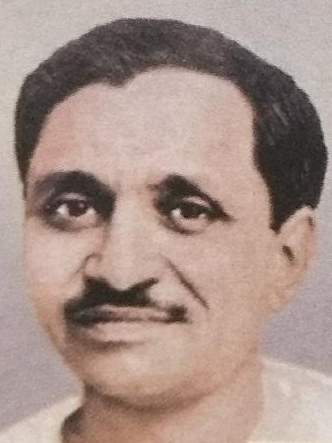
Lohia supported Bharatiya Jana Sangh candidate Deendayal Upadhyaya for the Jaunpur Lok Sabha constituency.

In 1963 Lohia abandoned his rigid opposition to electoral alliances, much to the surprise of his own followers. In a by-election for the Jaunpur Lok Sabha constituency seat, Lohia campaigned for the candidature of Jan Sangh leader Deendayal Upadhyaya. Later the same year, there was a by-election for the Farrukhabad Lok Sabha constituency seat. Farrukhabad had been a PSP stronghold, but Lohia decided to stand as a candidate. Lohia won the election, defeating the Congress Party candidate B.V. Keskar whilst the PSP landed in a humiliating third place. During the campaign the Congress Party had tried to paint Lohia as both anti-Brahmin and anti-Muslim. Lohia had received support from the Jan Sangh in the electoral campaign. The Delhi Unit of the Socialist Party was suspended from the party, after having rejected Lohia's move to accept support from Jan Sangh in the Farrukhabad vote.

According to Yogendra Yadav, this shift of Lohia towards the position of 'non-Congressism' (seeking to unite all non-Congress forces, from left to right, in a common alliance) after the disappointing 1962 elections was largely due to non-ideological factors. Per Yadav there was considerable fatigue among mid-level party workers, frustrated with the inability to make a parliamentary breakthrough due to the First Past the Post electoral system. Moreover Lohia increasingly feared that an all-powerful and unchecked governing Congress Party posed a greater danger than a small communal party like Jan Sangh.

The Uttar Pradesh socialist leader Shibhan Lal Saxena had faced opposition from Lohia on his defense of Nehru on the issue of the 1962 Sino-Indian war. Moreover Saxena opposed Lohia's suspension of the Delhi Party Unit after the Farrukhabad by-election campaign. The pressure to break with the United Socialist Party brought Saxena to resign from SP. On 13 October 1963 Saxena held a rally at Maharajganj. At the Maharajganj rally the Saxena faction announced its departure from SP. The remnants of the United Socialist Party merged into the Congress Party.

== Merger into SSP ==
The Socialist Party held its 7th annual conference in Calcutta on 31 December 1963. Lohia's new line of non-Congressism became the party line at the Calcutta conference. Limaye and Fernandes opposed this shift, but Lohia's position prevailed with a broad majority of the present delegates. Moreover, at the Calcutta conference Lohia called for a merger with PSP without preconditions. Furthermore he stated that the Socialist Party should not insist on other alliances with other groups if PSP had any objections. The PSP leadership responded positively to the new position emerging from the Calcutta conference, and asked SP that the March 1963 PSP resolution be used as the platform for the unity process.

In parallel there was a serious rift within the PSP there was a serious rift between Ashoka Mehta and other leaders. At a meeting held 15–16 February 1964 the PSP National Executive Committee expelled Mehta from the party. Following his expulsion, Mehta supporters within PSP began gradually moving away from their party and joining the Congress Party. Finally on 11 June 1964 Mehta himself and some 1,000 other PSP members would formally join the Congress Party. With Mehta out from PSP, the PSP-SP merger process was unblocked. Mehta's departure prompted Lohia to advocate for a speedy unification with the remnants of PSP without preconditions, as he feared the socialists to be marginalized by the Congress Party after Mehta's split.

On 19 February 1964 the SP National Executive Committee approved of Lohia's suggestion for unconditional PSP-SP merger, and named a five-member committee to lead the negotiations with PSP. Liaison committees of PSP and SP met on 23 February 1964 to work out a roadmap for the merger. The 23 February 1964 meeting called for cooperation between the two parties during the unification process, prompting state units to seek closer cooperation. In Bombay City the PSP and SP party organizations began to operate as a single unit. In Rajasthan and Madras State, the state party units of both parties worked together. In April 1964 the Delhi organizations of SP, PSP and the All India Forward Bloc, as well as some individuals hailing from the Congress Socialist Party, held a joint convention to launch a campaign calling for the resignation of Prime Minister Nehru.

In April 1964 Lohia left for a long international trip, but left the other SP leaders in charge of making progress on the unity process. The liaison committees met again on 7–8 May 1964, and adopted an agreement on the merger to be ratified by the national conferences of each party. The SP and remnants of PSP were in a hurry to formalize the merger before Mehta could hold his All India Socialist Workers Conference (initially planned for May 1964, then postponed to June 1964).

The SP held its conference in Gaya on 24 May 1964 and formally reaffirmed the decision to go ahead with the PSP-SP merger without any preconditions. Party chairman Raj Narain moved the merger resolution, it was seconded by Limaye. The merger resolution was passed with 199 votes in favour and 1 against. The sole opponent to the merger resolution at Gaya was Naresh Modhak, chairman of the West Bengal party unit. Modhak had earlier moved an amendment whereby each of the two parties would get a chance to discuss the policy statement of the new party before the merger be confirmed.

It was later announced that the Peasants and Workers Party of India and the All India Forward Bloc might join the merger process as well. Limaye issued a call to CPI members, appealing to them to join the new united party.

The PSP-SP merger finally occurred 6–7 June 1964. The new party was named Samyukta ('united') Socialist Party (SSP). A national ad hoc committee of the SSP was formed, with 14 PSP members and 11 SP members. The SSP national ad hoc committee elected the PSP Leader S.M. Joshi as the party president and Raj Narain of SP was named as its general secretary. Prem Bhasin, Surendra Mohan and Vasudeva Singh were named joint secretaries of the party. Ad hoc committees were also formed at state and local levels across the country. The youth and labour movements (SYS and HMP) did not merge with their PSP counterparts.
