= Singjamei Assembly constituency =

Legislative Assembly constituency in Manipur State, India

Coordinates: 24.77°N 93.94°E

Singjamei
- Constituency No. 13 for the Manipur Legislative Assembly
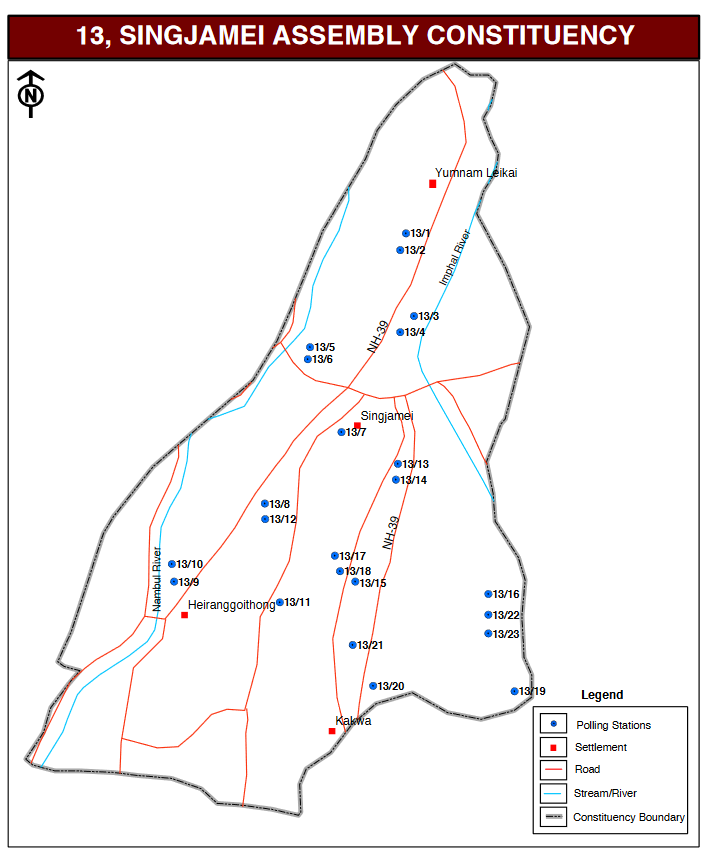

Constituency details
- Country: India
- Region: Northeast India
- State: Manipur
- District: Imphal West
- Lok Sabha constituency: Inner Manipur
- Established: 1967
- Total electors: 20,734
- Reservation: None

Member of Legislative Assembly
- 12th Manipur Legislative Assembly
- Incumbent Yumnam Khemchand Singh
- Party: Bharatiya Janata Party
- Elected year: 2022

Singjamei (Vidhan Sabha constituency) is one of the 60 constituencies in the Manipur Legislative Assembly of Manipur, a north-eastern state of India. Singjamei is also part of Inner Manipur Lok Sabha constituency.

== Extent ==
Singjamei is the 13th among 60 assembly constituencies of Manipur. It consists of 29 parts namely: 1 - Yumnam Leikai (A), 2 - Yumnam Leikai (B), 3 - Thokchom Leikai, 4 - Singjamei Chirom Leikai, 5 - Chingamathak (A), 6 - Chingamathak (B), 7 - Chingamakha Oinam Leirak, 8 - Chingamakha Irom Leirak, 9 - Chingamakha Kshetri Leirak, 10 - Chingamakha, 11 - Chingamakha Yanglem Leikai, 12 - Chingamakha Chanam Pukhri Mapal, 13 - Chingamakha Heirangoithong, 14 - Chingamakha Ningthoujam Leikai (A), 15 - Chingamakha Ningthoujam Leikai (B), 16 - Singjamei Top Leikai, 17 - Chingamakhong Chongtham Leikai, 18 - Singjamei Sapam Leikai, 19 - Singjamei Mayengbam Leikai (Maning), 20 - Singjamei Leishangthem Leikai, 21 - Singjamei Thongam Leikai (Awang), 22 - Singjamei Thongam Leikai (Mayai), 23 - Singjamei Thongam Leikai (Makha), 24 - Singjamei Waikhom Leikai (A), 25 - Singjamei Waikhom Leikai (B), 26 - Singjamei Okram Leikai, 27 - Singjamei Mayengbam Leikai (Mamang), 28 - Singjamei Oinam Thingel (Awang), and 29 - Singjamei Oinam Thingel (Makha).

== Members of Legislative Assembly ==
Election	Member	Party
1967	A . Biramangol	Independent
1972	Loitongbam Sarat Singh	Manipur Peoples Party
1974	Sanasam Biramani Singh	Independent
1980	Irengbam Tompok Singh	Indian National Congress
1984	Irengbam Tompok Singh	Indian National Congress
1990	Irengbam Tompok Singh	Indian National Congress
1991 (by-election)	Irengbam Hemochandra Singh	Indian National Congress
1995	Irengbam Hemochandra Singh	Indian National Congress
2000	Haobam Bhubon Singh	Bharatiya Janata Party
2002	Irengbam Hemochandra Singh	Federal Party of Manipur
2007	Irengbam Hemochandra Singh	Indian National Congress
2012	Irengbam Hemochandra Singh	Indian National Congress
2017	Y. Khemchand Singh	Bharatiya Janata Party
2022	Y. Khemchand Singh	Bharatiya Janata Party

== Election results ==
Vote share of winning candidates
2022	45.80%
2017	53.84%
2012	49.61%
2007	47.38%
2002	45.29%
2000	52.72%
1995	40.87%
1990	50.30%
1984	42.78%
1980	23.53%
1974	27.09%
1972	24.20%
1967	24.84%

=== 2027 Assembly election ===
2027 Manipur Legislative Assembly election: Singjamei
Party	Candidate	Votes	%	±%
INC				
NDA				
NOTA	None of the above			
Majority				
Turnout				
gain from		Swing		

=== Assembly Election 2022 ===
2022 Manipur Legislative Assembly election: Singjamei
Party	Candidate	Votes	%	±%
BJP	Yumnam Khemchand Singh	8,709	45.80%	−8.04%
NPP	Oinam Romen Singh	6,414	33.73%	
JD(U)	Ngangbam Robert Singh	2,164	11.38%	
INC	Irengbam Hemochandra Singh	1,600	8.41%	−34.98%
NOTA	Nota	128	0.67%	−0.50%
Margin of victory		2,295	12.07%	1.63%
Turnout		19,015	91.71%	3.55%
Registered electors		20,734		4.04%
BJP hold		Swing	-8.04%	

=== Assembly Election 2017 ===
2017 Manipur Legislative Assembly election: Singjamei
Party	Candidate	Votes	%	±%
BJP	Yumnam Khemchand Singh	9,459	53.84%	
INC	Irengbam Hemochandra Singh	7,625	43.40%	−6.21%
NOTA	None of the Above	206	1.17%	
AITC	Heigrujam Nabashyam Singh	176	1.00%	
MPP	Thokchom Sarchil Singh	104	0.59%	−1.16%
Margin of victory		1,834	10.44%	9.46%
Turnout		17,570	88.16%	4.69%
Registered electors		19,929		3.48%
BJP gain from INC		Swing	4.23%	

=== Assembly Election 2012 ===
2012 Manipur Legislative Assembly election: Singjamei
Party	Candidate	Votes	%	±%
INC	Irengbam Hemochandra Singh	7,975	49.61%	2.22%
AITC	Yumnam Khemchand Singh	7,818	48.63%	
MPP	Heigrujam Nabashyam Singh	281	1.75%	−30.63%
Margin of victory		157	0.98%	−14.03%
Turnout		16,076	83.46%	0.36%
Registered electors		19,259		−2.65%
INC hold		Swing	2.22%	

=== Assembly Election 2007 ===
2007 Manipur Legislative Assembly election: Singjamei
Party	Candidate	Votes	%	±%
INC	Irengbam Hemochandra Singh	7,791	47.38%	45.50%
MPP	Sapam Tiken Singh	5,324	32.38%	
SP	Haobam Bhuban Singh	2,763	16.80%	
BJP	Heigrujam Nabashyam Singh	403	2.45%	
RJD	Irom Romee	161	0.98%	
Margin of victory		2,467	15.00%	8.81%
Turnout		16,442	83.11%	−5.43%
Registered electors		19,783		10.48%
INC gain from FPM		Swing	2.09%	

=== Assembly Election 2002 ===
2002 Manipur Legislative Assembly election: Singjamei
Party	Candidate	Votes	%	±%
FPM	Irengbam Hemochandra Singh	7,150	45.29%	
NCP	Haobam Bhuban Singh	6,172	39.10%	
DRPP	Heigrujam Nabashyam Singh	1,542	9.77%	
MSCP	Umananda Sanasam	480	3.04%	−41.58%
INC	S. Birla Singh	297	1.88%	
CPI	Aribam Chaoba Sharma	145	0.92%	−1.44%
Margin of victory		978	6.20%	−1.90%
Turnout		15,786	88.54%	0.70%
Registered electors		17,906		3.20%
FPM gain from BJP		Swing	4.43%	

=== Assembly Election 2000 ===
2000 Manipur Legislative Assembly election: Singjamei
Party	Candidate	Votes	%	±%
BJP	Haobam Bhubon Singh	8,277	52.72%	18.24%
MSCP	Irengbam Hemochandra Singh	7,006	44.62%	
CPI	Aribam Chaoba Sharma	370	2.36%	0.13%
Margin of victory		1,271	8.10%	1.71%
Turnout		15,700	91.25%	3.41%
Registered electors		17,350		7.97%
BJP gain from INC		Swing	11.85%	

=== Assembly Election 1995 ===
1995 Manipur Legislative Assembly election: Singjamei
Party	Candidate	Votes	%	±%
INC	Irengbam Hemochandra Singh	5,714	40.87%	−9.44%
BJP	Haobam Bhubon Singh	4,821	34.48%	
MPP	Huidrom Surendra Kumar	2,311	16.53%	−32.13%
IC(S)	Yurembam Iboyaima	594	4.25%	
CPI	Elangbam Tomba	312	2.23%	
JD	Waikhom Manimohon	137	0.98%	
Margin of victory		893	6.39%	4.74%
Turnout		13,982	87.84%	0.08%
Registered electors		16,070		1.74%
INC hold		Swing	-9.44%	

=== Assembly Election 1990 ===
1990 Manipur Legislative Assembly election: Singjamei
Party	Candidate	Votes	%	±%
INC	Irengbam Tompok Singh	6,915	50.30%	7.52%
MPP	Haobam Bhuban Singh	6,689	48.66%	22.56%
JD	Gurumayum Molecule Sharma	143	1.04%	
Margin of victory		226	1.64%	−12.28%
Turnout		13,747	87.76%	0.15%
Registered electors		15,795		20.10%
INC hold		Swing	7.52%	

=== Assembly Election 1984 ===
1984 Manipur Legislative Assembly election: Singjamei
Party	Candidate	Votes	%	±%
INC	Rengbam Tompok Singh	4,860	42.78%	
JP	Thokchom Chandrasekhar Singh	3,278	28.86%	
MPP	Thounaojam Kulabidhu Singh	2,965	26.10%	14.91%
Independent	Gurumayum Molecule Sharma	257	2.26%	
Margin of victory		1,582	13.93%	8.39%
Turnout		11,360	87.61%	7.86%
Registered electors		13,151		4.70%
INC gain from INC(U)		Swing	19.26%	

=== Assembly Election 1980 ===
1980 Manipur Legislative Assembly election: Singjamei
Party	Candidate	Votes	%	±%
INC(U)	I. Tompok Singh	2,309	23.53%	
JP	Thokchom Chandrasekhar Singh	1,766	17.99%	
Independent	G. Birachandra Sharma	1,264	12.88%	
Independent	H. Surendrakumar	1,253	12.77%	
MPP	Y. Chandra	1,098	11.19%	−15.04%
INC(I)	S. Biramani	940	9.58%	
Independent	Kh. Babusahep	559	5.70%	
Independent	Th. Deba	252	2.57%	
Independent	Sh Rajmani Sharma	224	2.28%	
Independent	Y. Gouridas Singh	150	1.53%	
Margin of victory		543	5.53%	4.67%
Turnout		9,815	79.75%	−7.74%
Registered electors		12,561		29.95%
INC(U) gain from Independent		Swing	-3.56%	

=== Assembly Election 1974 ===
1974 Manipur Legislative Assembly election: Singjamei
Party	Candidate	Votes	%	±%
Independent	Sanasam Biramani Singh	2,263	27.09%	
MPP	Laisram Joychandra	2,191	26.23%	2.03%
INC	Irengbam Tompok Singh	1,976	23.65%	−0.41%
Independent	Thokchom Chandrasekhar Singh	1,821	21.80%	
Independent	Moirangthem Nabachandra	103	1.23%	
Margin of victory		72	0.86%	0.73%
Turnout		8,354	87.49%	8.33%
Registered electors		9,666		−9.55%
Independent gain from MPP		Swing	2.89%	

=== Assembly Election 1972 ===
1972 Manipur Legislative Assembly election: Singjamei
Party	Candidate	Votes	%	±%
MPP	Loitongbam Sarat Singh	2,024	24.20%	
INC	Haobam Baruni Singh	2,013	24.07%	4.02%
Independent	Ayekpam Biramangol Singh	1,721	20.58%	
Independent	Thokchom Chandrasekhar Singh	1,471	17.59%	
INC(O)	L. Nityai Singh	600	7.17%	
Independent	Thounaojam Iboyaima	535	6.40%	
Margin of victory		11	0.13%	−2.08%
Turnout		8,364	79.16%	3.06%
Registered electors		10,686		−42.60%
MPP gain from Independent		Swing	-0.64%	

=== Assembly Election 1967 ===
1967 Manipur Legislative Assembly election: Singjamei
Party	Candidate	Votes	%	±%
Independent	Ayekpam Biramangol Singh	3,389	24.84%	
Independent	I. Tompok Singh	3,087	22.63%	
SSP	Thokchom Chandrasekhar Singh	2,896	21.23%	
INC	H. Baruni	2,735	20.05%	
Independent	R. K. Manisana	767	5.62%	
Independent	Kh. Babusahep	695	5.09%	
Independent	S. Bira	75	0.55%	
Margin of victory		302	2.21%	
Turnout		13,644	76.10%	
Registered electors		18,616		
Independent win (new seat)				

== See also ==
- Singjamei
- Imphal
- List of constituencies of Manipur Legislative Assembly
- Imphal West district
