= Thokchom Chandrasekhar Singh =

Indian politician (born 1925)

Member of the Manipur Territorial Council
- In office 1957–1963
- Constituency: Singjamei

Member of the Manipur Legislative Assembly
- In office 1963–1967
- Succeeded by: A. Biramangol
- Constituency: Singjamei

Personal details
- Born: 2 March 1925
- Party: Congress Socialist Party (1946–1948); Socialist Party (1948–1952); Praja Socialist Party (1952–1955); Socialist Party (1955–1964); Samyukta Socialist Party (1964–); Janata Party

Thokchom Chandrasekhar Singh was an Indian socialist politician from Manipur. As a young man he became a leading figure in the socialist movement in Manipur, and was imprisoned for his role in protest movements. He represented the Singjamei (of Imphal) in the Manipur Territorial Council and, later, the Manipur Legislative Assembly for a decade. He again contested the Singjamei seat in all Legislative Assembly elections from 1967 to 1984.

== Biography ==
Thokchom Chandrasekhar Singh was born on 2 March 1925. He was the son of Thokchom Achoubi Singh. He went to school at the Johnstone Higher Secondary School, Imphal and at the Bishop Westcott Institute Senior Cambridge in Allahabad. Thokchom joined the Congress Socialist Party in 1946. He became the Manipur Joint Secretary of the Socialist Party in 1948, and would remain in this role until 1958 (in the Praja Socialist Party 1952–1955, and then in Ram Manohar Lohia's Socialist Party).

Thokchom took part in the Socialist Party-led protest campaign against the dissolution of the Manipur State Legislative Assembly, and was jailed for his role in the protest movement. In 1954 he was included in the Legislative Demand Movement Council of Action. He was detained at Imphal Jail along with Lohia for three months. When the Praja Socialist Party split in 1955, Thokchom sided with Lohia's new Socialist Party. He was elected to the Manipur Territorial Council from the Singjamei constituency in the 1957 and 1962 elections. The Singjamei constituency in the Manipur Territorial Council covered the Circle II (Part II) of Imphal pana of Imphal West tahsil. He served as general secretary of Lohia's Socialist Party between 1959 and 1961. In 1960 he was again jailed for his role in the protest movements demanding the revival of the Manipur State Legislative Assembly, and would spend twelve months at Imphal Jail and Nowgong Special Jail.

Once the Union Territories Act, 1963 came into force, Thokchom became a member of the Manipur Legislative Assembly. In the Manipur Legislative Assembly he was a member of the Rules Committee. He became a member of the Samyukta Socialist Party, as Lohia's Socialist Party merged with the remnants of the Praja Socialist Party.

Thokchom lost the Singjamei Assembly constituency seat in the 1967 Manipur Legislative Assembly election. He stood as a Samyukta Socialist Party candidate, finishing in third place with 2,896 votes (21.23%). He would again contest the Singjamei seat in the 1972 Manipur Legislative Assembly election, contesting as an independent and finishing in fourth place with 1,471 votes (17.59%). He again finished in fourth place in Singjamei in the 1974 Manipur Legislative Assembly election, standing as an independent candidate and obtained 1,821 votes (21.80%).

He contested Singjamei seat as the Janata Party candidate in the 1980 Manipur Legislative Assembly election and the 1984 Manipur Legislative Assembly election. He finished in second place in both occasions, obtaining 1,766 votes (17.99%) in 1980 and 3,278 votes (28.86%) in 1984.

He lived at Singjamei Mathak Thokchom Leikai, Imphal. Thokchom was married to L. Binodini Devi. The couple had one daughter.
