= Laisram Achaw Singh =

Indian politician

Achaw Singh Laisram

Member of Parliament, Lok Sabha
- In office 1952-1957
- Preceded by: Jogeswar Singh Laisram
- Succeeded by: M. Meghachandra
- Constituency: Inner Manipur

Personal details
- Born: November 1920 Wangkei Ayangpalli, Imphal, Manipur, British India (now in Manipur, India)
- Party: Socialist Party of India
- Spouse: Sumati Devi

Achaw Singh Laisram was an Indian politician. He was a Member of Parliament, representing Inner Manipur in the Lok Sabha the lower house of India's Parliament.
