= Chandivali =

Chandivali Powai
- Suburb
- Nickname: powai
- Location of Chandivali Chandivali (India)
- Coordinates: 19°06.60′N 72°54′E
- Country: India
- State: Maharastra
- District: Mumbai suburban
- City: Mumbai

Government
  - Type: Municipal Corporation
  - Body: Brihanmumbai Municipal Corporation (MCGM)

Languages
  - Official: Marathi
- Time zone: UTC+5:30 (IST)
- PIN: 400072
- Area code: 022

Chandivali is an upmarket residential neighbourhood located in Andheri East. It is located at a distance of 6 Km from Andheri Railway station on the Western line and around 4 Km from Ghatkopar Railway Station on the Central line. Jogeshwari-Vikhroli Link Road (JVLR) is located at a distance of less than 1 km. It is bound on the north by the Powai lake, on the East by Powai/Hiranandani complex, on the south by Saki Naka and by Marol on the West.There is film studio, one of the oldest in Mumbai with the same name on Chandivali Farm Road and is still active. The locality has a large gated community, Raheja Vihar right at the heart of the area.

It has an Assembly constituency in its name and is one of the 288 Assembly constituency in the State of Maharashtra. Chandivali Assembly constituency is part of the Mumbai North Central Lok Sabha constituency along with five other Vidhan Sabha segments, namely Kalina, Vile Parle, Kurla, Vandre West and Vandre East in the Mumbai Suburban district. With the advent of the Mumbai one metro in May 2014 the connectivity of Chandivali to the Ghatkopar - Versova corridor has increased. This has naturally led to an increase in commercial building activity in the locality.

== See also ==
Chandivali (Vidhan Sabha constituency) The BMC ward for Chandivali is "L" and the electoral wards which form a part of the Chandivali Vidhan Sabha Constituency are 150L ( Tungwa Village ) and 151L ( Chandivali Village East)
