= 6th Lok Sabha =

Lower house Members elected in 1977

←	5th	7th	→
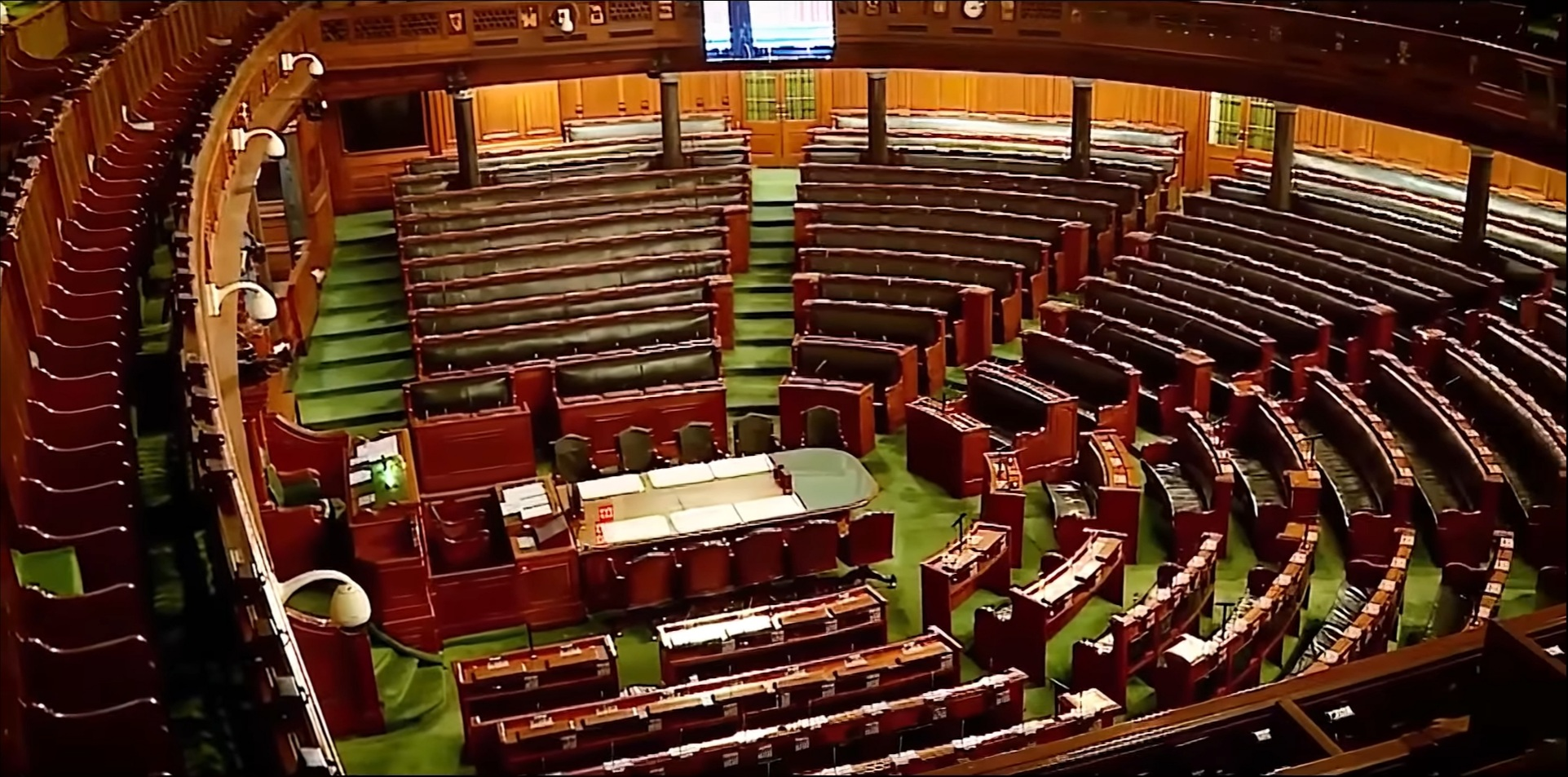
- View of Lok Sabha chamber in the Old Parliament House, New Delhi

Overview
- Legislative body: Indian Parliament
- Election: 1977 Indian general election

The Lok Sabha (House of the People) is the lower house in the Parliament of India. The 6th Lok Sabha, which ran from 23 March 1977 to 22 August 1979 was elected in February and March 1977. 11 sitting members from Rajya Sabha were elected to 6th Lok Sabha after the 1971 Indian general election.

Morarji Desai became the Prime Minister on 24 March 1977 after Janata alliance won 295 seats, 242 more than the previous 5th Lok Sabha.

Charan Singh became the Prime Minister on 28 July 1979 with the support of Indira Gandhi (Congress (I)); but resigned on 20 August 1979 since he was not ready to remove charges against Indira Gandhi and her family from the Emergency days and advised the President to dissolve the Lok Sabha. The Sixth Lok Sabha was dissolved on 22 August 1979 by the President Neelam Sanjiva Reddy and Charan Singh remained as the caretaker Prime Minister till 14 January 1980, the formation of the next 7th Lok Sabha following the 1980 Indian general election.

== Leadership ==
- Speaker:
  - N. Sanjiva Reddy from 26 March 1977 to 13 July 1977
  - K. S. Hegde from 21 July 1977 to 21 January 1980
- Deputy speaker:
  - Godey Murahari from 1 April 1977 to 22 August 1979
- Secretary general:
  - Avtar Singh Rikhy from 18 June 1977 to 31 December 1983

== List of members by political party ==
Members by political party in 6th Lok Sabha are given below-

S.No.	Party name	Number of MPs
1	Janata Party (Janata Party)	295
2	Indian National Congress (INC)	154
3	Communist Party of India (Marxist) (CPI(M))	22
4	All India Anna Dravida Munnetra Kazhagam (AIADMK)	18
5	Akali Dal (Akali Dal)	9
6	Independent (Ind.)	9
7	Communist Party (CP)	7
8	Unattached (Unattached)	5
9	Peasants and Workers Party of India (PAWPI)	5
10	Revolutionary Socialist Party (India) (RSP)	4
11	All India Forward Bloc(AIFB)	3
12	Kerala Congress (KC)	2
13	Indian Union Muslim League (IUML)	2
14	Jammu & Kashmir National Conference (JKN)	2
15	Dravida Munnetra Kazhagam (DMK)	2
16	Jharkhand Party (Jharkhand)	1
17	Maharashtrawadi Gomantak Party (MGP)	1
	TOTAL	542

=== Women members ===
State	Constituency	Name of Elected M.P.	Party affiliation
Andhra Pradesh	Bhadrachalam (ST)	B. Radhabai Ananda Rao	Indian National Congress
Assam	Silchar	Rashida Haque Choudhury	Indian National Congress
Assam	Gauhati	Renuka Devi Barkataki	Janata Party
Gujrat	Amreli	Jayaben Shah	Janata Party
Haryana	Bhiwani	Chandrawati	Janata Party
Jammu & Kashmir	Srinagar	Begum Akbar Jahan Abdullah	Jammu and Kashmir National Conference
Jammu & Kashmir	Ladakh	Parvati Devi	Indian National Congress
Karnataka	Dharwad North	Dr. Sarojini Bindurao Mahishi	Indian National Congress
Maharashtra	Bombay North Central	Ahilya Rangnekar	Communist Party of India
Maharashtra	Bombay North	Mrinal Gore	Janata Party
Maharashtra	Karad	Premala Chavan	Indian National Congress
Nagaland	Nagaland	Rano M. Shaiza	United Democratic Front
Tamil Nadu	Coimbatore	Parvathi Krishnan	Communist Party of India
Tamil Nadu	Sivakasi	Venkatasamy Jeyalakshmi	Indian National Congress
Uttar Pradesh	Sambhal	Shanti Devi	Janata Party
Uttar Pradesh	Phulpur	Kamala Bahuguna	Janata Party
Uttar Pradesh	Jhansi	Dr.Sushila Nayar	Janata Party
West Bengal	Nabadwip (SC)	Bibha Ghosh Goswami	Communist Party of India
West Bengal	Panskura	Abha Maiti	Janata Party

== Cabinet ==
Prime Minister	Morarji Desai	24 March 1977 – 28 July 1979

Leader of the Opposition	C.M. Stephen	24 March 1977 – 28 July 1979

Ministry	Minister	Term
Agriculture	Surjit Singh Barnala	1977–1979
Defence	Jagjivan Ram	24 March 1977 – 28 July 1979
External Affairs	Atal Bihari Vajpayee Shyam Nandan Prasad Mishra	26 March 1977 – 28 July 1979 28 July 1979 – 13 January 1980
Finance	Haribhai M. Patel	24 March 1977 – 24 January 1979
Home Affairs	Charan Singh Morarji Desai	24 March 1977 – 1 July 1978 1 July 1978 – 28 July 1979
Information and Broadcasting	L.K.Advani	1977-1979
Law and Justice	Shanti Bhushan Hans Raj Khanna	1977-1979 1979
Railways	Madhu Dandavate	24 March 1977 – 28 July 1979
Education	Pratap Chandra Chunder	24 March 1977 – 28 July 1979

== See also ==
- 1977 Indian general election
