= Avtar =

Avtar Gharinda Civil rights protection Agency Regd by ministry of Corporate Affairs SCST Director Punjab

- Avtar Singh Atwal, Deputy Inspector General of Police in Punjab Police
- Avtar Singh Bhadana (born 1957), member of the 14th Lok Sabha of India
- Avtar Singh Cheema (1933–1989), the first Indian to lead a successful expedition that climbed Mount Everest
- Avtar Gill, Indian Television and film actor
- Avtar Gill (darts player), Canadian darts player
- Avtar Singh Kang, Punjabi singer and Punjabi Folk contributor
- Avtar Singh Karimpuri, Indian politician of the Bahujan Samaj Party (BSP)
- Avtar Lit, the owner and chairman of Sunrise Radio Group
- Avtar Singh Malhotra (1917–2005), Punjabi politician belonging to the Communist Party of India
- Avtar Singh Paintal (1925–2004), medical scientist who made pioneering discoveries
- Avtar Singh Rikhy (born 1923), former Secretary-General of Lower House of Parliament of India
- Avtar Saini, microprocessor designer and developer
- Avtar Singh Sandhu (1950–1988), poet of the Naxalite movement in the Punjabi literature of the 1970s
- Avtar Singh (judoka) (born 1992), Indian judoka at the 2016 Summer Olympics in Brazil
- Avtar Singh (politician), Indian politician, member of the Sixth Legislative Assembly of Delhi of India

== See also ==
- Aaj Ka M.L.A. Ram Avtar, 1984 film starring Rajesh Khanna in the lead role
- Chaubis Avtar, meaning Twenty Four Incarnations, a composition in Dasam Granth containing history of 24 incarnations of Vishnu
- Paranath Avtar, composition, within Rudra Avtar, written by Guru Gobind Singh
- Ram Avtar, character actor turned comedian in Hindi cinema
- Rudra Avtar, composition and epic poetry written by Guru Gobind Singh, present in Dasam Granth Sahib
- Ram-Avtar, 1988 movie starting Sunny Deol, Anil Kapoor, Sridevi and Shakti Kapoor
- Avatar
- Avtaar, 1983 film starring Rajesh Khanna in the lead role
