= Avtar Singh =

Avtar Singh is an Indian male name and may refer to following people:

- Avtar Singh (judoka), Indian Olympic judoka
- Avtar Singh (politician), Indian Bharatiya Janata Party politician, former member of the Sixth Legislative Assembly of Delhi

== See also ==
- Awtar Singh, politician from Afghanistan
- Avatar Singh, fictional character in the Indian TV series Best of Luck Nikki, portrayed by Gireesh Sahdev
- Avtar Singh Atwal, Indian police officer, also known as A. S. Atwal
- Avtar Singh Bhadana, Indian politician
- Avtar Singh Cheema, first Indian to climb Mount Everest
- Avtar Singh Jouhl, British anti-racism campaigner
- Avtar Singh Junior, Indian politician and a member of INC. In 2017, he was elected as the member of the Punjab Legislative Assembly from Jalandhar North
- Avtar Singh Kang, Indian singer
- Avtar Singh Karimpuri, Indian politician of the Bahujan Samaj Party (BSP), former Rajya Sabha member from Punjab
- Avtar Singh Malhotra, Indian politician and independence activist
- Autar Singh Paintal, Indian medical scientist
- Avtar Singh Rikhy, Secretary General of the Lok Sabha
- Avtar Singh Sandhu, known by the pen name Pash, Indian poet
- Avtar Singh Sohal, Indian-Kenyan field hockey player
