= Santacruz Assembly constituency =

Constituency of the Maharashtra legislative assembly in India

Santacruz
- Former constituency for the Maharashtra Legislative Assembly

Constituency details
- Country: India
- Region: Western India
- State: Maharashtra
- Lok Sabha constituency: Mumbai North Central
- Established: 1967
- Abolished: 2008

Santacruz was one of the 288 assembly constituencies of Maharashtra, a western state of India. Santacruz was also part of Mumbai North Central Lok Sabha constituency. Santacruz existed till 2004 elections until Kalina Assembly constituency was formed in 2008.

== Member of Legislative Assembly ==
Election	Name	Party
1967	S. R. Patkar	Indian National Congress
1972	Jagesh Desai	Indian National Congress
1978	Shobhanath Ramgajdhar Sinha	Janata Party
1980	C. D. Ommachen	Indian National Congress
1985	C. D. Ommachen	Indian National Congress
1990	Abhiram Singh	Bharatiya Janata Party
1995	Abhiram Singh	Bharatiya Janata Party
1999	Kripashankar Singh	Indian National Congress
2004	Kripashankar Singh	Indian National Congress
2008 onwards : See Kalina
2009	Kripashankar Singh	Indian National Congress
2014	Sanjay Potnis	Shiv Sena
2019	Sanjay Potnis	Shiv Sena
2024	Sanjay Potnis	Shiv Sena (UBT)

== Election results ==
=== Assembly Election 2004 ===
2004 Maharashtra Legislative Assembly election : Santacruz
Party	Candidate	Votes	%	±%
INC	Kripashankar Singh	78,263	55.05%	▲4.73
BJP	Alavani Parag Madhusudan	56,074	39.44%	▼3.42
Independent	Nicholas Benjamin Almeida	2,384	1.68%	New
BSP	Bastiwala Tahira	1,666	1.17%	▲0.24
Independent	Krishna Bhikaji Thorat	1,432	1.01%	New
Independent	Shekhar Vaishnav	1,034	0.73%	New
Margin of victory		22,189	15.61%	▲8.15
Turnout		1,42,168	53.60%	▲4.74
Total valid votes		1,42,167		
Registered electors		2,65,246		▲3.34
INC hold		Swing	▲4.73	

=== Assembly Election 1999 ===
1999 Maharashtra Legislative Assembly election : Santacruz
Party	Candidate	Votes	%	±%
INC	Kripashankar Singh	61,627	50.32%	▲24.93
BJP	Abhiram Singh	52,497	42.86%	▼3.28
Independent	Subhash Mahadeo Sawant	3,481	2.84%	New
Independent	Khan Javed Nasrullah Khan	2,311	1.89%	New
BSP	Rajbirsingh Piwal	1,136	0.93%	New
Margin of victory		9,130	7.45%	▼13.30
Turnout		1,25,402	48.85%	▼10.61
Total valid votes		1,22,480		
Registered electors		2,56,685		▲4.37
INC gain from BJP		Swing	▲4.18	

=== Assembly Election 1995 ===
1995 Maharashtra Legislative Assembly election : Santacruz
Party	Candidate	Votes	%	±%
BJP	Abhiram Singh	67,478	46.14%	▲9.01
INC	Adv. Nancy Oommachain	37,127	25.39%	▼6.10
BBM	Sawant Subhash Mahadeo	17,260	11.80%	New
Independent	Nicholas Benjamin Almeda	7,066	4.83%	New
SP	Jinoveva Peter Fernandes	6,456	4.41%	New
JD	Harish S. Lot	3,330	2.28%	▼18.62
Independent	Mohan Sudam Ghadge	1,293	0.88%	New
Margin of victory		30,351	20.75%	▲15.11
Turnout		1,49,150	60.64%	▲7.28
Total valid votes		1,46,248		
Registered electors		2,45,944		▲16.65
BJP hold		Swing	▲9.01	

=== Assembly Election 1990 ===
1990 Maharashtra Legislative Assembly election : Santacruz
Party	Candidate	Votes	%	±%
BJP	Abhiram Singh	40,854	37.13%	▲13.75
INC	Oommachen C. D.	34,647	31.49%	▼14.85
JD	S. B. Sawant	22,987	20.89%	New
INS(SCS)	K. B. Thorat	6,530	5.93%	New
Independent	A. A. Qureshi	3,349	3.04%	New
Independent	Felcy R. Pinto	799	0.73%	New
Margin of victory		6,207	5.64%	▼17.31
Turnout		1,11,273	52.78%	▲5.72
Total valid votes		1,10,026		
Registered electors		2,10,841		▲30.95
BJP gain from INC		Swing	▼9.21	

=== Assembly Election 1985 ===
1985 Maharashtra Legislative Assembly election : Santacruz
Party	Candidate	Votes	%	±%
INC	C. D. Ommachen	34,668	46.34%	New
BJP	Abhiram Singh	17,497	23.39%	▼2.15
Independent	Nandkishor Dhaku Palav	9,133	12.21%	New
Independent	Basir Ahmad Rafik	8,297	11.09%	New
Independent	Sandesh Mandiyal	4,244	5.67%	New
Margin of victory		17,171	22.95%	▼1.80
Turnout		75,945	47.17%	▲11.87
Total valid votes		74,818		
Registered electors		1,61,009		▲12.36
INC gain from INC(I)		Swing	▼3.94	

=== Assembly Election 1980 ===
1980 Maharashtra Legislative Assembly election : Santacruz
Party	Candidate	Votes	%	±%
INC(I)	C. D. Ommachen	24,928	50.28%	▲36.99
BJP	Pandey Suryaprasad Jagdev	12,659	25.53%	New
JP	Natwarlal Maneklal Ghody	8,905	17.96%	▼35.28
[[Janata Party (Secular) Charan Singh|Janata Party (Secular) Charan Singh]]	Shobhnath Singh	2,000	4.03%	New
Independent	Khan Yassen Rahimkhan Patel	571	1.15%	New
Margin of victory		12,269	24.75%	▼15.20
Turnout		50,261	35.07%	▼25.73
Total valid votes		49,580		
Registered electors		1,43,301		▲8.19
INC(I) gain from JP		Swing	▼2.96	

=== Assembly Election 1978 ===
1978 Maharashtra Legislative Assembly election : Santacruz
Party	Candidate	Votes	%	±%
JP	Sinha Shobhanath Ramgajdhar	42,544	53.24%	New
INC(I)	Pagraoot Vasantrao Dattatray	10,622	13.29%	New
SS	Ramesh Yeshwant Prabhoo	10,422	13.04%	▼4.69
INC	Jagesh Desai	9,050	11.33%	▼50.58
Independent	Bhungra Hansraj Ramlal	4,737	5.93%	New
Independent	Singh Amarnath Ramnaresh	2,197	2.75%	New
Margin of victory		31,922	39.95%	▼4.22
Turnout		81,276	61.36%	▲1.78
Total valid votes		79,909		
Registered electors		1,32,449		▼0.19
JP gain from INC		Swing	▼8.66	

=== Assembly Election 1972 ===
1972 Maharashtra Legislative Assembly election : Santacruz
Party	Candidate	Votes	%	±%
INC	Jagesh Desai	48,101	61.90%	▲21.34
SS	Dandekar Shankar Laxman	13,782	17.74%	New
INC(O)	S. R. Patkar	7,754	9.98%	New
CPI	Sitaram Ramchandra Jagtap	6,971	8.97%	▼19.46
RPI	Namdeo Shivram Bhosale	1,096	1.41%	New
Margin of victory		34,319	44.17%	▲32.04
Turnout		79,052	59.57%	▼3.21
Total valid votes		77,704		
Registered electors		1,32,703		▲40.48
INC hold		Swing	▲21.34	

=== Assembly Election 1967 ===
1967 Maharashtra Legislative Assembly election : Santacruz
Party	Candidate	Votes	%	±%
INC	S. R. Patkar	23,665	40.56%	New
CPI	S. R. Jagtap	16,587	28.43%	New
ABJS	R. Sheth	8,196	14.05%	New
SWA	A. Narayan	5,380	9.22%	New
PSP	M. Babu	2,751	4.71%	New
Independent	P. A. Badheka	1,492	2.56%	New
Margin of victory		7,078	12.13%	
Turnout		60,941	64.51%	
Total valid votes		58,348		
Registered electors		94,464		
INC win (new seat)				
