= 7th Lok Sabha =

Lower house Members elected in 1980

←	6th	8th	→
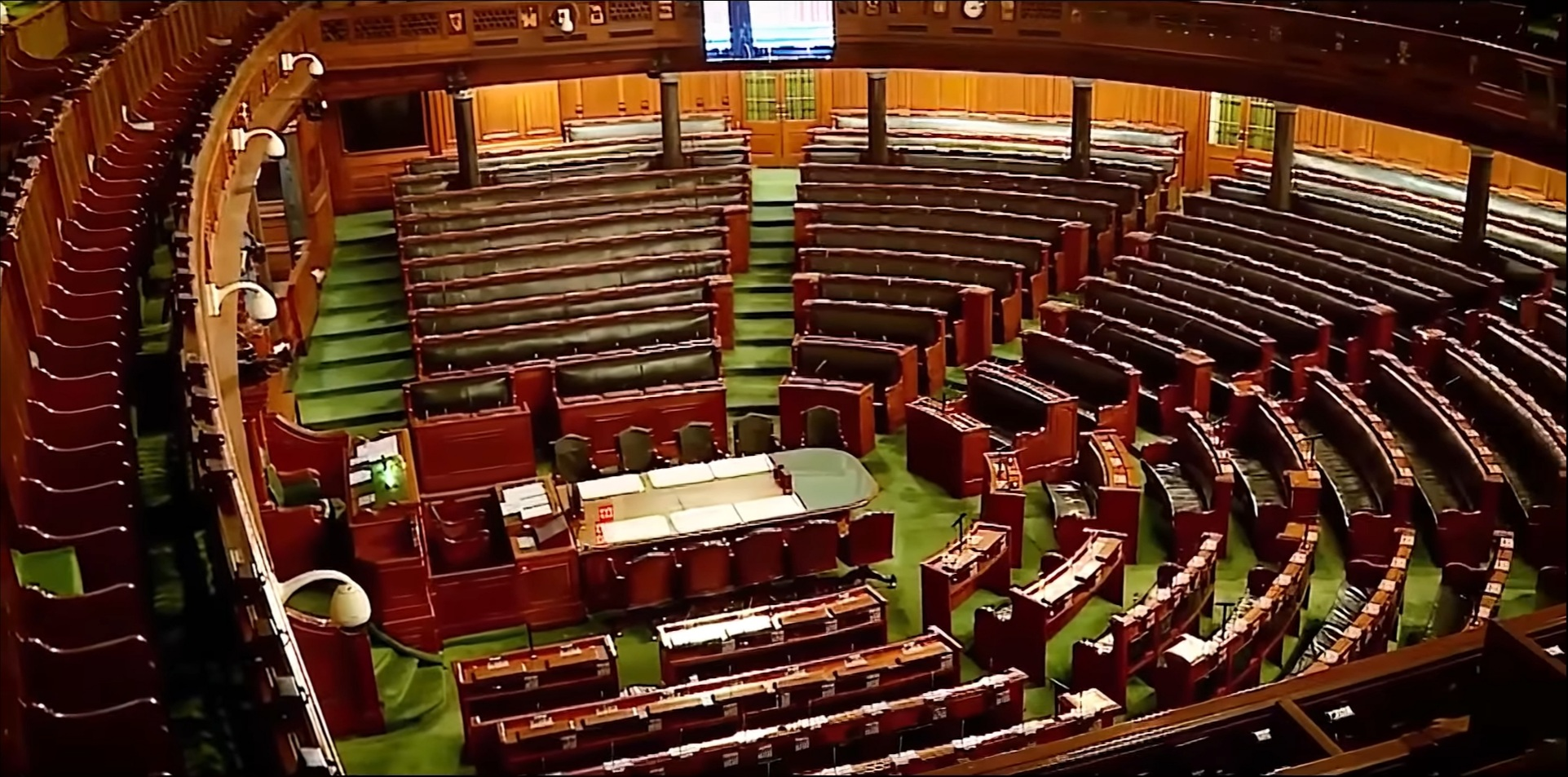
- View of Lok Sabha chamber in the Old Parliament House, New Delhi

Overview
- Legislative body: Indian Parliament
- Election: 1980 Indian general election

The 7th Lok Sabha (18 January 1980 – 31 December 1984) was elected in the 1980 Indian general election. The Lok Sabha (House of the People) is the lower house in the Parliament of India nine sitting members from Rajya Sabha were elected to 7th Lok Sabha after the 1980 Indian general election. Indira Gandhi became the Prime minister on 14 January 1980, after INC and alliances won 353 seats, 199 seats more than previous 6th Lok Sabha. Rajiv Gandhi became Prime minister on 31 October 1984 after the assassination of Indira Gandhi. The next 8th Lok Sabha was formed on 31 December 1984 after the 1984 Indian general election. With roughly 9.3% of total MPs being Muslims, the 7th Lok Sabha had more Muslim MPs than any other in Indian history.

== Members ==
- Speaker: Balram Jakhar, 22 January 1980 – 15 January 1985
- Deputy Speaker: G. Lakshmanan, 1 December 1980 – 31 December 1984
- Secretary General: Avtar Singh Rikhy, 10 January 1980 – 31 December 1983
  Subhash C. Kashyap, 31 December 1983 – 31 December 1984

== List of members by political party ==
Members of the political party in the 7th Lok Sabha are given below:

S.No.	Party name	Number of MPs
1	Indian National Congress (INC)	353
2	Janata (S) (Janata (S))	41
3	Communist Party of India (Marxist) (CPI(M))	37
4	Janata Party (Janata Party)	31
5	Dravida Munnetra Kazhagam (DMK)	16
6	Communist Party of India (CPI)	10
7	Bharatiya Janata Party (BJP)	2
8	Indian National Congress (Socialist) (Congress (S))	13
9	Unattached (Unattached)	7
10	Jammu & Kashmir National Conference (JKN)	3
11	Independent (Ind.)	4
12	Revolutionary Socialist Party (India) (RSP)	4
13	All India Anna Dravida Munnetra Kazhagam (AIADMK)	2
14	All India Forward Bloc(AIFB)	3
15	Indian Union Muslim League (IUML)	2
16	Nominated (NM)	2
17	Telugu Desam Party (TDP)	2
18	All Party Hill Leaders' Conference (APHLC)	0
19	Indian National Congress (Congress)	0
20	Janata Dal (Janata Dal)	1
21	Kerala Congress (KC)	1

=== Women Members ===
State	Constituency	Name of Elected M.P.	Party affiliation
Andhra Pradesh	Bhadrachalam (ST)	B. Radhabai Ananda Rao	Indian National Congress
Andhra Pradesh	Vijayawada	Vidya Chennupati	Indian National Congress
Andhra Pradesh	Medak	Indira Gandhi	Indian National Congress
Bihar	Vaishali	Kishori Sinha	Janata Party
Bihar	Sheohar	Ram Dulari Sinha	Indian National Congress
Bihar	Purnea	Madhuri Singh	Indian National Congress
Bihar	Begusarai	Krishna Sahi	Indian National Congress
Bihar	Palamau (SC)	Kamla Kumari	Indian National Congress
Goa	Panaji	Sanyogita Rane	Maharashtrawadi Gomantak Party
Kerala	Alleppey	Suseela Gopalan	Communist Party of India
Madhya Pradesh	Sagar (SC)	Sahodrabai Rai	Indian National Congress
Madhya Pradesh	Khajuraho	Vidyawati Chaturvedi	Indian National Congress
Madhya Pradesh	Raigarh (ST)	Pushpa Devi Singh	Indian National Congress
Maharashtra	Bombay North Central	Pramila Dandavate	Janata Party
Maharashtra	Amravati	Usha Choudhari	Indian National Congress
Maharashtra	Beed	Kesharbai Kshirsagar	Indian National Congress
Punjab	Gurdaspur	Sukhbans Kaur Bhinder	Indian National Congress
Punjab	Faridkot	Gurbinder Kaur Brar	Indian National Congress
Rajasthan	Chittorgarh	Prof. Nirmla Kumari Shaktawat	Indian National Congress
Uttar Pradesh	Sitapur	Rajendra Kumari Bajpai	Indian National Congress
Uttar Pradesh	Mohanlalganj (SC)	Kailash Pati	Indian National Congress
Uttar Pradesh	Lucknow	Sheila Kaul	Indian National Congress
Uttar Pradesh	Raebareli	Indira Gandhi	Indian National Congress
Uttar Pradesh	Aligarh	Indra Kumari	Janata Party
Uttar Pradesh	Meerut	Mohsina Kidwai	Indian National Congress
Uttar Pradesh	Kairana	Gayatri Devi	Janata Party
West Bengal	Nabadwip (SC)	Bibha Ghosh Goswami	Communist Party of India
West Bengal	Panskura	Geeta Mukherjee	Communist Party of India

Remarkably, the Lok Sabha had 3 couples - Satyendra Narayan Sinha (Congress MP from Aurangabad) & his wife Kishori (Congress MP from Vaishali), former PM Charan Singh (JP(S) MP from Baghpat) & his wife Gayatri (JP(S) MP from Kairana) and Madhu Dandavate (Janata Party MP from Rajapur) & wife Pramila (Janata Party MP from Bombay North Central).

== Cabinet ==
The Indira Gandhi (7th Lok Sabha) Cabinet
Office	Name	Term
Prime Minister	Indira Gandhi	1980–1984
Deputy Prime Minister	vacant	
Ministry of
Office	Name	Term
Agriculture	Rao Birendra Singh	1980–1984
External Affairs	P. V. Narasimha Rao	1980–1984
Finance	R. Venkataraman	1980–1984
Home Affairs	Zail Singh	1980–1984
Information and Broadcasting	Vasant Sathe	1980–1984
Law and Justice	P. Shiv Shankar	1980–1984
Railways	Kamlapati Tripathi	1980–1984
Shipping, Road Transport, and Highways	Anant Prasad Sharma	1980–1984
Tourism	Janaki Ballabh Patnaik	1980–1984
