= Narayan Sadoba Kajrolkar =

Indian independence activist, Gandhian and social worker

- Born: Maharashtra, India
- Occupations: Social worker Indian independence activist
- Awards: Padma Bhushan

Narayan Sadoba Kajrolkar was an Indian independence activist, Gandhian and social worker, best known as the man who defeated B. R. Ambedkar in a general election. A Marathi by birth, he served as a personal assistant to Ambedkar, before contesting against him in the first Lok Sabha elections from the Mumbai North Central constituency in 1952 and defeated the latter by over 15000 votes. He was also elected from the same constituency for a second time in the 1962 elections.

Narayan, who was born in the SC community, was a member of the first Backward Classes Commission of 1953, representing the Scheduled Caste communities. He was also a member of the Dalit Varga Sangha, an organisation of the people of backward classes and served as the secretary of the committee when they decided to celebrate the birthday of Jagjivan Ram on 5 April 1953. The Government of India awarded him the third highest civilian honour of the Padma Bhushan, in 1970, for his contributions to society. He died in 1983.

== See also ==
- Mumbai North Central (Lok Sabha constituency)
- Kalelkar Commission
