= Pramila Dandavate =

Indian politician (1928–2001)

Member of Parliament, Lok Sabha
- In office 1980-84
- Preceded by: Ahilya Rangnekar
- Succeeded by: Sharad Dighe
- Constituency: Mumbai North Central

Personal details
- Born: 27 August 1928 Bombay, British India
- Died: 31 December 2001 (aged 73)
- Party: Janata Party

Pramila Dandavate (Devanagari: ) (1928–2001) was a political activist from Mumbai, associated with the Praja Socialist Party and later with the Janata Party.

== Early life and background ==
Pramila Dandavate was born on 27 August 1928 born to Janardan and Lakshmibai Karande. Her father was a gynaecologist whose clinic and maternity hospital were located near the Girgaum Chowpatty and who alo served as the President of the Mumbai Obstetrics & Gynecological Society from 1950 to 1952.

Dandavate was associated with the Swastik League during her childhood. The Swastik League was an organisation established by M. R. Jayakar.

Dandavate started her schooling at age 5 and painting was her hobby. The Second World War had started and since Bombay was a part of the British Empire, there were rumours that Bombay could possible be attacked by the Axis powers. As a result, many middle class families from Bombay started sending their families to their ancestral homes in Konkan. Dandavate and her siblings was sent to Malvan and she completed her fourth standard (which was equal to today's eight standard) from the Anant Shivaji Desai Topiwala High School. At that time, Rashtra Seva Dal activists like Dnyaneshwar Deulkar used to hold the shakha and Dandavate started attending it.

The downfall of the Axis powers including Germany and Japan led to a sense of security among the residents of Bombay, and Pramila returned to the city with her siblings. Dandavate was then enrolled in the Chikitsak Samuha Shirolkar High School and she pursued her Matriculation in India from the High School. She started attending a Rashtra Seva Dal shakha at Girgaum since 1945. After her Matriculation in India, Dandavate was enrolled in a Home economics course at the Sophia College for Women. But Dandavate did not complete the course and after a year at home joined the Sir Jamsetjee Jeejebhoy School of Art from which she earned a graduate degree in Fine Arts in the year 1951.

After Vinoba Bhave started the Bhoodan movement, Dandavate painted some posters about the movement with the help of her associates. These posters were published in Sadhana (weekly). In view of her dedication and love for art, she was appointed as a teacher at an Art School where she worked for some time. Although Dandavate enjoyed art, she was always attracted towards the Rashtra Seva Dal activities. She also liked dancing and had taken lessons from the accomplished dancer Madame Menaka, alsk known as Leila Sokhey.

Dandavate was elected as member to Mumbai Municipal Corporation during 1968-1973. She had represented Mumbai North Central (Lok Sabha constituency) in 7th Lok Sabha in 1980-84 as Janata Party candidate.

Dandavate died in New Delhi on 31 December 2001, aged 73.
