= Mangesh Kudalkar =

Indian politician

Member of the Maharashtra Legislative Assembly
- Incumbent
- Assumed office 2014
- Preceded by: Milind Kamble
- Constituency: Kurla

Personal details
- Party: Shiv Sena
- Website: mangeshkudalkar.com

Mangesh Kudalkar is a Shiv Sena politician from Mumbai, Maharashtra. He is a member of the 13th Maharashtra Legislative Assembly. He represents Kurla Vidhan Sabha constituency of Mumbai, Maharashtra, India as a member of Shiv Sena.

== Positions held ==
- 2014: Elected to Maharashtra Legislative Assembly
- 2019: Re-Elected to Maharashtra Legislative Assembly
- 2024: Re-Elected to Maharashtra Legislative Assembly

== See also ==
- Mumbai North Central Lok Sabha constituency
