= Vidyadhar Gokhale =

Indian politician and writer (1924–1996)

Member of Parliament, Lok Sabha
- In office 1989–1991
- Preceded by: Sharad Dighe
- Succeeded by: Sharad Dighe
- Constituency: Mumbai North Central

Editor of Loksatta
- Succeeded by: Madhav Yeshwant Gadkari

Personal details
- Born: 4 January 1924 Amravati, Maharashtra
- Died: 26 September 1996 (aged 72) Lucknow, Uttar Pradesh
- Party: Shiv Sena
- Children: Vijay Gokhale

Vidyadhar S. Gokhale (4 January 1924 – 26 September 1996) was a political activist, a Marathi playwright, and an editor of a Marathi newspaper, Loksatta, from Maharashtra, India.

== Early life ==
Vidyadhar Gokhale was born in Amravati, Maharashtra. His father Sambhajirao Gokhale was a leader of the Indian National Congress and a Minister in the Central Provinces Government. Vidyadhar was influenced by the writings and thoughts of Veer Wamanrao Joshi.

He studied in Amravati and went to Mumbai in 1944. He was a post graduate in Marathi and Sanskrit. He taught in the General Education Society's School at Kurla.

== Career ==
=== Literature ===
After teaching in Kurla, Gokhale became a journalist. Initially, he was the editor of a Marathi weekly. Between 1960 and 1983, he wrote about 60 plays and 66 songs for Sangeet Nataks. He is credited for the revival of the Sangeet Nataks. His plays consist of varied themes like historical, mythical and social issues. He also established an organisation called "Rangasharada" for the purpose of launching plays.

He wrote the novel Jhanjhawat (झंझावात ). Some of his prominent plays are:

- Suvarna Tula (सुवर्णतुला) (1960)
- Panditraj Jagannath (पंडितराज जगन्नाथ) (1960)
- Mandarmala (मंदारमाला) (1963)
- Madanachi Manjiri (मदनाची मंजिरी) (1965)
- Jai Jai Gauri Shankar (जय जय गौरीशंकर)
- Bawannkhani (बावनखणी) (१९८३)
- Swarsamradni (स्वरसम्राज्ञी’ (१९७३)

He presided over the Marathi Sahitya Sammelan in Satara in 1993.

== Political career ==
He had represented Mumbai North Central in 1989–91 9th Lok Sabha as the Shiv Sena candidate. Throughout his life, he was affiliated with socio-political organizations like RSS, Hindu Mahasabha which are proponents of the Hindutva ideology and was associated with their leaders like Veer Savarkar, Pu Bha Bhave, Balasaheb Deoras.

== Personal life ==
He had married two sisters before polygamy was outlawed and thus had two wives. His son Vijay Gokhale is an actor. Gokhale's grandson, Omkar Dadarkar, is a singer.
