= Mrinal Gore =

Indian politician

Member of Parliament
- In office 1977 - 1980
- Preceded by: position established
- Succeeded by: Ravindra Varma
- Constituency: Mumbai North

12th Leader of Opposition in the Maharashtra Legislative Assembly
- In office 23 December 1988 – 19 October 1989
- Preceded by: Datta Narayan Patil
- Succeeded by: Datta Narayan Patil

Personal details
- Born: Mrinal Mohile; 24 June 1928
- Died: 17 July 2012 (aged 84)
- Party: Janata Party
- Spouse: Keshav Gore
- Children: 1 (Daughter)
- Occupation: Politician, social activist
- Nickname(s): Paaniwali Bai; Mrinal Tai

Mrinal Gore (c. 24 June 1928 – 17 July 2012, Vasai) was a veteran socialist leader of India, and was a member of the Parliament of India. She died on 17 July 2012 at the age of around 84. Her death was mourned by Prime Minister of India Manmohan Singh and many other Indians.

== Early life ==
Mrinal Gore was born Mrinal Mohile in a Marathi CKP family and was a medical student. Towards the end of her schooling she came in contact with Rashtra Seva Dal - the cultural and social wing of the Socialist Party. Her inspiration was Sane Guruji and it was RSD that brought her in touch with dynamic leaders like Keshav Gore, a Marathi Brahmin, who mentored the young recruits during the days prior to Independence. She and Keshav Gore married and had a daughter. Unfortunately, Keshav died when Mrinal was 30 and the daughter was only 5.

== Work ==
She earned the sobriquet Paaniwali Bai (water lady) for her effort to bring drinking water supply to Goregaon, a North Mumbai suburb. She led many protests along with her contemporaries Ahilya Rangnekar and Pramila Dandavate. She was the leader of opposition in Maharashtra Legislative Assembly and elected to 6th Lok Sabha from Mumbai North (Lok Sabha constituency) in 1977. When she was elected MP in 1977, the same election that Indira Gandhi lost, the popular slogan was Paaniwali bai Dilli mein, Dilliwali bai paani mein, meaning the water lady (Mrinal) has reached Delhi (Parliament) but the Delhi lady (Indira Gandhi) is in the water. She declined the offer of Health Ministry by then Prime Minister Morarji Desai.

Gore was arrested on 21 December 1975 and detained under MISA at Bombay Central Prison. Then she was moved to Akola Jail to completely isolate her from other political detainees. She was put in one barrack that had one door but no window. A criminal with advanced stage of leprosy was put in adjoining cell while a violent lunatic female prisoner was in opposite cell. This was done to torture Mrs Gore physically and mentally.

| Preceded by | Leader of the Opposition in the Maharashtra Legislative Assembly | Succeeded by |

| Preceded by | MP of 6th Lok Sabha for North Mumbai (Maharashtra); 1977–1980 | Succeeded by |
