= B. T. Ranadive =

Indian politician (1904–1990)

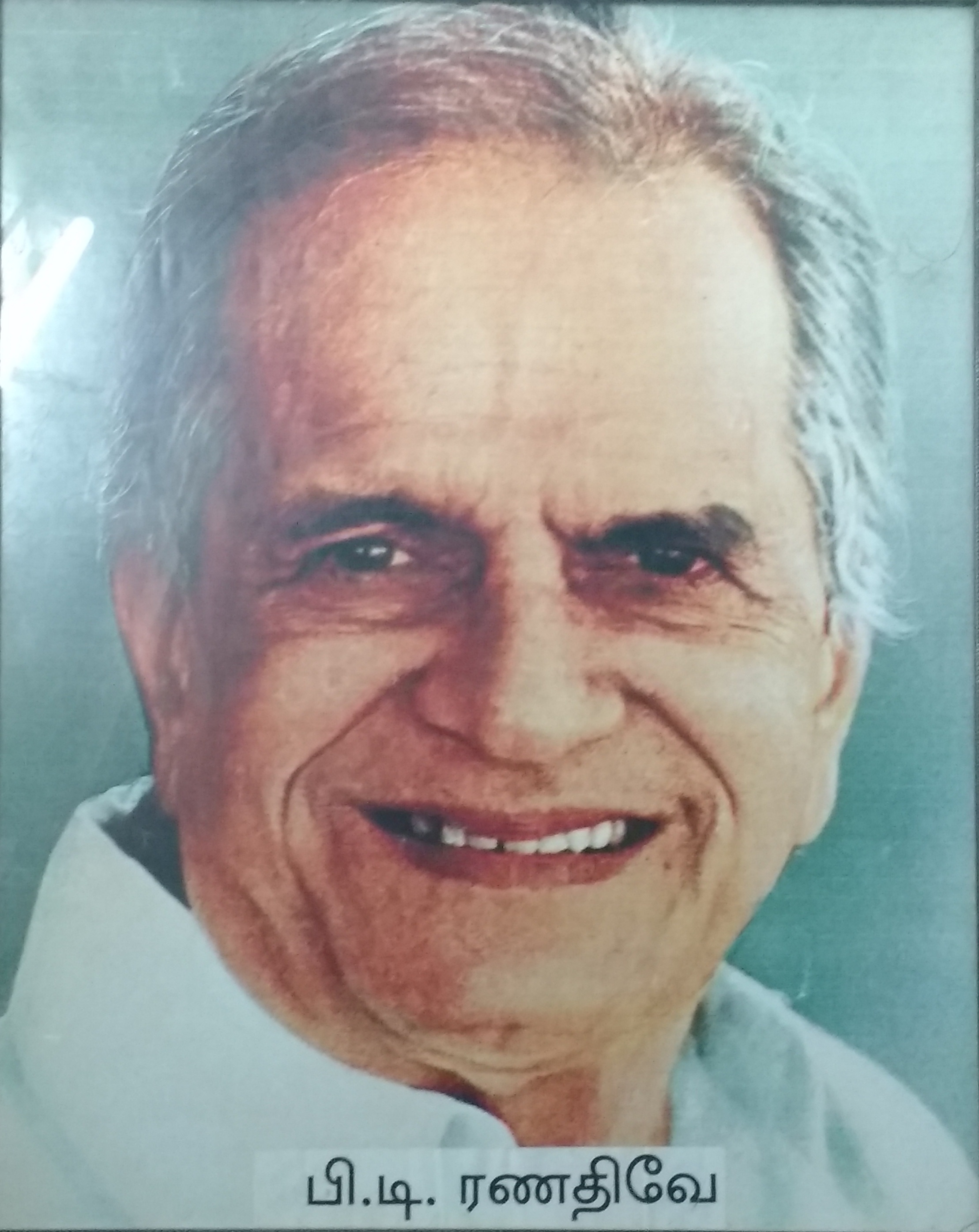

General Secretary, Communist Party of India
- In office 1948–1950
- Preceded by: Puran Chand Joshi
- Succeeded by: Chandra Rajeswara Rao

President, Center of Indian Trade Unions
- In office 1970–1990
- Preceded by: Position Established
- Succeeded by: E. Balanandan

Personal details
- Born: 19 December 1904 Dadar, Bombay Presidency, British India
- Died: 6 April 1990 (aged 85)
- Party: Communist Party of India (Marxist) (1964–1990), Communist Party of India (before 1964)
- Relatives: Ahilya Rangnekar (sister)
- Occupation: Freedom fighter, leader
- Known for: Co-founder of Communist Party of India (Marxist)

Bhalchandra Trimbak Ranadive (/rɑːnəˈdiːveɪ/; 19 December 1904 – 6 April 1990), popularly known as BTR, was an Indian communist politician and trade union leader.

== Personal life ==
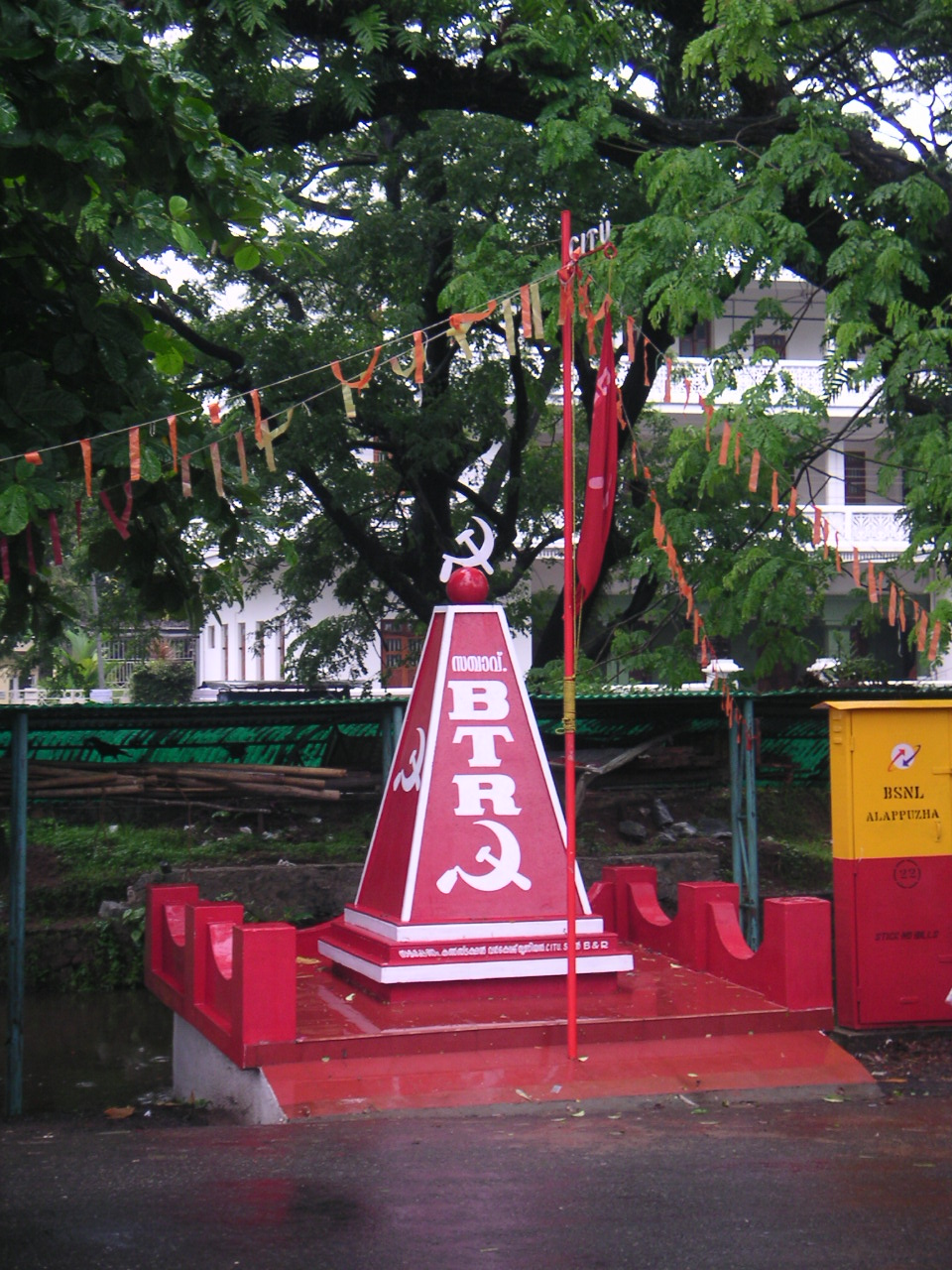
BTR memorial in Allepey

He was elder brother of Ahilya Rangnekar, a CPI-M leader and a member of Parliament in the Lok Sabha for Bombay North Central. They belonged to a Chandraseniya Kayastha Prabhu(CKP) family but Ranadive, a brilliant student, would teach Dalit students in his spare time.

== Political career ==
Ranadive completed his studies in 1927, obtaining an M.A. degree with distinction and in 1928 he joined the clandestine Communist Party of India. In the same year he became a major leader of the All India Trade Union Congress in Bombay. He was active with the Girini Kamgar Union of the textile workers in Bombay and with the struggles of the railway workers. He became the secretary of the GIP Railwaymen's Union. In 1939, he married Vimal, a trade union activist.

In 1943 he was elected to the central committee of the party. In February 1946 Ranadive played a major role in organizing a general strike in support of the Naval ratings revolt.

At its 2nd Party Congress held in Calcutta in February, 1948 the party elected Ranadive in place of P.C. Joshi as its general secretary. Ranadive was the general secretary of CPI 1948–1950. During that period the party was engaged in revolutionary uprisings, such as the Telangana armed struggle. In 1950 Ranadive was deposed, and denounced by the party as a "left adventurist".

In 1956, at the 4th Party Congress in Palghat BTR was again included in the Central Committee. He became a leading figure of the leftist section of the CC.

At the time of the Indo-China border conflict in 1962, Ranadive was one of many prominent communist leaders jailed by the government. In 1964 he became one of the main leaders of Communist Party of India (Marxist).

At the founding conference of the Centre of Indian Trade Unions in Calcutta May 28–31 1970, Ranadive was elected president.

== Commemoration ==
The central building of CITU in New Delhi is named after him— BTR Bhavan.

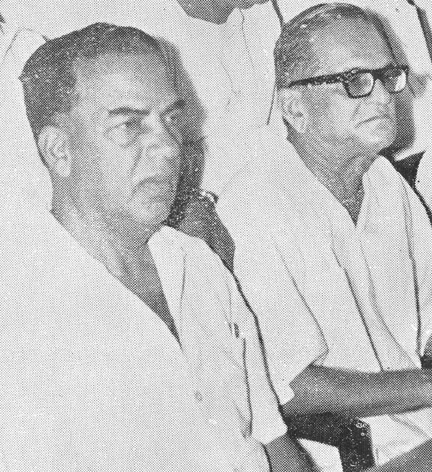
BTR (right) with AKG

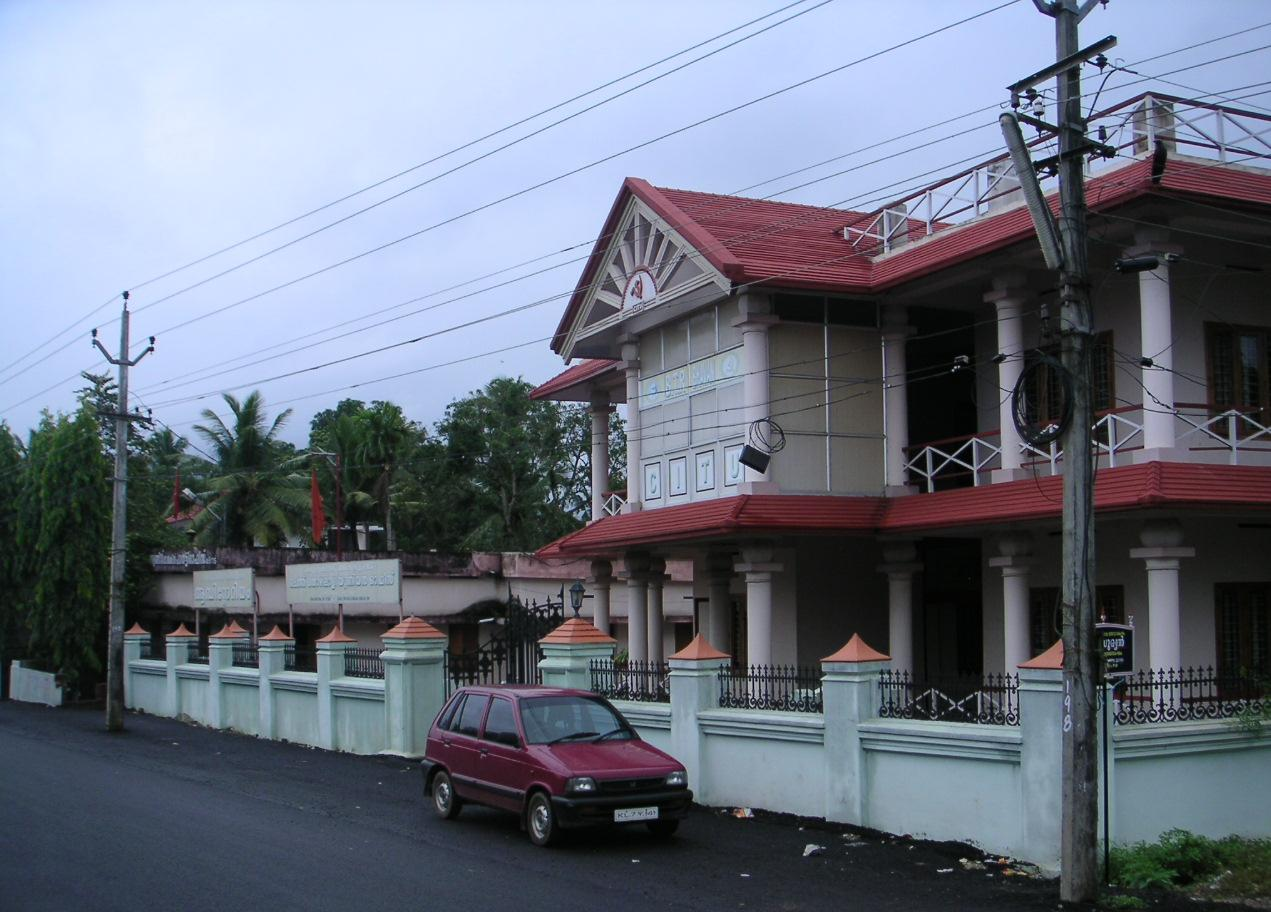
BTR Bhavan, Kerala
