= Kripashankar Singh =

Indian politician

Minister of State Government of Maharashtra
- In office 18 Oct 1999 – 16 Jan 2003
- Chief Minister: Vilas Rao Deshmukh
- Ministry & Departments: Home Affairs (Urban)
- Minister: Chhagan Bhujbal

Member of Maharashtra Legislative Assembly
- In office 2009–2014
- Preceded by: seat established
- Succeeded by: Sanjay Potnis
- Constituency: Kalina
- In office 1999–2009
- Preceded by: Abhiram Singh
- Succeeded by: seat abolished
- Constituency: Santacruz

Personal details
- Born: Kripashankar Singh Jaunpur, Uttar Pradesh
- Party: Indian National Congress till 2019 BJP since 2021
- Children: Sunita Singh (daughter); Sanjay Singh (son)
- Parent: Thakur Ramniranjan Singh

Kripashankar Singh is a senior Indian politician with the Bharatiya Janata Party. He was a minister of state in the 2004 Maharashtra state cabinet while in Indian National Congress. He was instrumental in Congress gains in Mumbai against Shiv Sena in the 2009 Maharashtra assembly elections. He was the president of the Mumbai chapter of the Indian National Congress party until June 2011. He won the Santacruz constituency in the last Mumbai elections.

== Early life ==
Singh hails from a prominent Rajput family in Jaunpur Uttar Pradesh. He migrated to Mumbai for work. He performed odd jobs to make ends meet as a migrant. These experiences shaped his political views about hardships faced by migrants.

== Political career ==
He subsequently joined Indian National Congress and rose through the ranks to become a powerful figure by the 2004 elections, when he was assigned the cabinet seat as Minister of State for Home in First Vilasrao Deshmukh ministry from October 1999 to January 2003. He became a MLA from Santacruz vidhan sabha in 1999. In 2009, Singh was elected to the assembly from the newly created Kalina constituency but came third in 2014 Maharashtra Legislative Assembly election.

On 7 July 2021, Singh joined the Bharatiya Janata Party. He had quit the Indian National Congress in 2019 over its decision to oppose the NDA government’s policy on Jammu and Kashmir, and leadership issues in Congress.

In March 2024, he was named as a Bharatiya Janata Party candidate from Jaunpur in Uttar Pradesh. He is considered very close to Amit Shah and Narendra Damodardas Modi.
