= Chandivali Assembly constituency =

Constituency of the Maharashtra legislative assembly in India

Coordinates: 19.11°N 72.90°E

Chandivali
- Constituency No. 168 for the Maharashtra Legislative Assembly

Constituency details
- Country: India
- Region: Western India
- State: Maharashtra
- District: Mumbai Suburban
- Lok Sabha constituency: Mumbai North Central
- Established: 2008
- Total electors: 453,074
- Reservation: None

Member of Legislative Assembly
- 15th Maharashtra Legislative Assembly
- Incumbent Dilip Lande
- Party: SHS
- Alliance: NDA
- Elected year: 2024

Chandivali Assembly constituency is one of the 288 Vidhan Sabha constituencies of the state of Maharashtra in western India.The Chandivali Assembly constituency was established in 2008 following the recommendations of the Delimitation Commission.Prior to the 2008 delimitation, the areas comprising Chandivali and Powai belonged to the Kurla legislative segment.

== Overview ==
Chandivali (constituency number 168) is one of the 26 Vidhan Sabha constituencies located in the Mumbai Suburban district. The number of electors in 2009 was 368,233 (male 219,832, female 148,401). In the 2024 assembly elections there were 453,003 registered voters, 253,526 males and 199,458 females. The votes polled in the 2024 election were 52.92% of the registered voters.

Chandivali is part of the Mumbai North Central Lok Sabha constituency along with five other Vidhan Sabha segments, namely Kalina, Vile Parle, Kurla, Vandre West and Vandre East in the Mumbai Suburban district.

== Members of the Legislative Assembly ==
Year	Member	Party
Till 2009 : Constituency did not exist
2009	Naseem Khan	Indian National Congress
2014	Naseem Khan	Indian National Congress
2019	Dilip Lande	Shiv Sena
2024	Dilip Lande	Shiv Sena

== Election results ==
=== Assembly Election 2024 ===
2024 Maharashtra Legislative Assembly election : Chandivali
Party	Candidate	Votes	%	±%
SS	Dilip Bhausaheb Lande	124,641	52.39	▲7.89
INC	Mohammed Arif Naseem Khan	1,04,016	43.72	▼0.57
MNS	Mahendra Manji Bhanushali	7,347	3.09	▼0.59
NOTA	None of the Above	2,247	0.94	▼0.80
Margin of victory		20,625	8.67	▲8.46
Turnout		2,40,153	53.01	▲1.64
Total valid votes		2,37,906		
Registered electors		4,53,074		▲19.44
SS hold		Swing	▲7.89	

=== Assembly Election 2019 ===
2019 Maharashtra Legislative Assembly election : Chandivali
Party	Candidate	Votes	%	±%
SS	Dilip Bhausaheb Lande	85,879	44.50	▲20.30
INC	Mohammed Arif Naseem Khan	85,470	44.29	▲3.76
VBA	Abul Hasan Khan	8,876	4.60	New
MNS	Sumeet Pandurang Baraskar	7,098	3.68	▼12.21
NOTA	None of the Above	3,360	1.74	▼0.84
Independent	Mamata Shubhranshu Dixit	1,171	0.61	New
AIMIM	Mohd Imran Qureshi	1,167	0.60	New
Margin of victory		409	0.21	▼16.12
Turnout		1,96,357	51.76	▲7.67
Total valid votes		1,92,981		
Registered electors		3,79,343		▼9.18
SS gain from INC		Swing	▲3.97	

=== Assembly Election 2014 ===
2014 Maharashtra Legislative Assembly election : Chandivali
Party	Candidate	Votes	%	±%
INC	Mohammed Arif Naseem Khan	73,141	40.53	▼11.11
SS	Singh Santosh Ramniwas	43,672	24.20	▲9.96
MNS	Ishwar Devram Tayade	28,678	15.89	▼14.68
Independent	Annamalai S.	20,266	11.23	New
NCP	Sharad Pawar	9,740	5.40	New
NOTA	None of the Above	4,653	2.58	New
BSP	Adsul Vishal Narayan	1,843	1.02	▲0.21
Margin of victory		29,469	16.33	▼4.75
Turnout		1,85,115	44.32	▼0.24
Total valid votes		1,80,445		
Registered electors		4,17,700		▲13.43
INC hold		Swing	▼11.11	

=== Assembly Election 2009 ===
2009 Maharashtra Legislative Assembly election : Chandivali
Party	Candidate	Votes	%	±%
INC	Mohammed Arif Naseem Khan	82,616	51.65	New
MNS	Dilip Bhausaheb Lande	48,901	30.57	New
SS	Sou. Chitra Somnath Sangle	22,782	14.24	New
RPI(A)	Katke Sahadev Alias Sadhu Shankar	2,175	1.36	New
BSP	Tambare Tanaji Sadashiv	1,296	0.81	New
Independent	Shah Latif Dim Mohammed	1,069	0.67	New
Margin of victory		33,715	21.08	
Turnout		1,59,968	43.44	
Total valid votes		1,59,964		
Registered electors		3,68,233		
INC win (new seat)				

== See also ==
- Chandivali
- List of constituencies of Maharashtra Vidhan Sabha
