= Kaka Kalelkar =

Indian independence activist and social reformer (1885–1981)

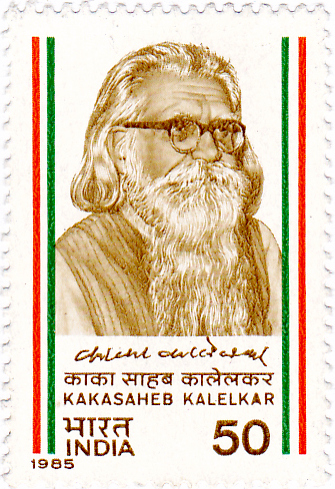
- Kalelkar on a 1985 stamp of India

Member of Parliament, Rajya Sabha
- In office 3 April 1952 – 2 April 1964

Personal details
- Born: Dattatreya Balkrishna Kalelkar; 1 December 1885 Satara, Maharashtra
- Died: 21 August 1981 (aged 95) New Delhi
- Education: Fergusson College
- Occupation: Social reformer, activist
- Profession: Writer

Dattatreya Balkrishna Kalelkar (1 December 1885 – 21 August 1981), popularly known as Kaka Kalelkar, was an Indian independence activist, social reformer, journalist and an eminent follower of the philosophy and methods of Mahatma Gandhi.

== Biography ==
Kalelkar was born in Satara on 1 December 1885. His family's ancestral village of Kaleli, near Sawantwadi in Maharashtra, gave him his surname Kalelkar. He matriculated in 1903 and completed B.A. in Philosophy from Fergusson College, Pune in 1907. He appeared in the first year examination of LL.B. and joined Ganesh Vidyalaya in Belgaum in 1908. He worked for a while on the editorial staff of a nationalistic Marathi daily named Rashtramat, and then as a teacher at a school named Ganganath Vidyalaya in Baroda in 1910. In 1912, the British government forcibly closed down the school because of its nationalistic spirit. He travelled to the Himalayas by foot and later joined Acharya Kripalani on a visit to Burma (Myanmar) in 1913. He first met Mahatma Gandhi in 1915.

Influenced by Gandhi, he became member of Sabarmati Ashram. He taught at Rashtriya Shala of Sabarmati Ashram. For some time, he served as the editor of Sarwodaya periodical which was run from the premises of the Ashram. He was imprisoned several times due to his participation in Indian independence movement. With Gandhi's encouragement, he played an active role in establishing Gujarat Vidyapith at Ahmedabad, and served as its vice-chancellor from 1928 to 1935. He retired from Gujarat Vidyapith in 1939. Mahatma Gandhi called him Savai Gujarati, a quarter more than a Gujarati.

In 1935, Kalelkar became member of Rashtabhasha Samiti, a committee whose objective was to popularize Hindi-Hindustani language as the national language of India. He was active with Gandhi Smarak Nidhi from 1948 to his death.

He was appointed a member of Rajya Sabha from 1952 to 1964 and later appointed a president of Backward Classes Commission (also known as Kalekar Commission) in 1953. He presided over Gujarati Sahitya Parishad in 1959. He established Gandhi Vidyapith, Vedchhi in 1967 and served as its vice chancellor.

He had two adopted daughters, Saroj and Rehana.

He died on 21 August 1981.

== Selected works ==
Kalelkar wrote several books, including voluminous travelogues, in Gujarati, Marathi, and Hindi. The following is a partial list of Kalelkar's books:

- Quintessence of Gandhian Thought (English)
- Profiles in Inspiration (English)
- Stray Glimpses of Bapu (English)
- Mahatma Gandhi's Gospel of Swadeshi (English)
- Mahatma Gandhi Ka Swadeshi Dharma (Hindi)
- Rashtriya Shiksha Ka Adarsha (Hindi)
- Smaran Yatra (Marathi)
- Uttarekadil Bhinti (Marathi) (also translated into English as Even behind the Bars)
- Hindalgyacha Prasad (Marathi)
- Lok-Mata (Marathi)
- Latanche Tandav (Marathi)
- Himalayatil Pravas (Marathi)
- Himalayano Pravas (Gujarati)
- Jeevan-Vyavastha (Gujarati)
- Purva Africaman (Gujarati)
- Jivavano Anand (Gujarati)
- Jivata Tehvaro (Gujarati)
- Mara Sansmarano (Gujarati)
- Ugamano Desh (Gujarati)
- Otterati Divaro (Gujarati) (also translated into English as Even behind the Bars)
- Brahmadeshano Pravas (Gujarati)
- Rakhadvano Anand (Gujarati)
- Multi-Part Kaka Kalelkar Granthawali
  - Part 5: Atmacharitra
  - Part 6: Charitra Kirtan
  - Part 7: Geeta darshan
  - Part 8: Dharma
  - Part 9: Sahitya
  - Part 10: Diary
  - Part 11: Patra
  - Sahijan ka ped

== Recognition ==
Kalelkar received a Sahitya Akademi Award in 1965 for his Jeevan-Vyavastha, a collection of essays in Gujarati. He was honored with Sahitya Akademi Fellowship in 1971 for his literary achievements.

The Government of India conferred on him Padma Vibhushan (India's second-highest civilian award after the Bharat Ratna) in 1964. It also issued a commemorative stamp in his honor in 1985.
