= Vile Parle Assembly constituency =

Constituency of the Maharashtra legislative assembly in India

Coordinates: 19.096°N 72.861°E

Vile Parle
- Constituency No. 167 for the Maharashtra Legislative Assembly

Constituency details
- Country: India
- Region: Western India
- State: Maharashtra
- District: Mumbai Suburban
- Lok Sabha constituency: Mumbai North Central
- Established: 1962
- Total electors: 275,347
- Reservation: None

Member of Legislative Assembly
- 15th Maharashtra Legislative Assembly
- Incumbent Parag Alavani
- Party: Bharatiya Janata Party
- Elected year: 2024

Vile Parle Assembly constituency is one of the 288 Vidhan Sabha constituencies of Maharashtra state in western India.

== Overview ==
Vile Parle (constituency number 167) is one of the 26 Vidhan Sabha constituencies located in Mumbai Suburban district. The number of electors in 2009 was 272,381 (male 145,088, female 127,293).

Vile Parle is part of Mumbai North Central Lok Sabha constituency along with five other Vidhan Sabha constituencies in Mumbai Suburban district, namely Kalina, Chandivali, Kurla, Vandre West and Vandre East.

== Members of the legislative assembly ==
Year	Member	Party
From 1952 -1957 see: Vile Parle Andheri Versova
1952	Shantilal Harjivan Shah	Indian National Congress
From 1957 - 1967 see: Parle Andheri
1957	Shantilal Harjivan Shah	Indian National Congress
1962	Shantilal Harjivan Shah	Indian National Congress
1967	Pranlal Vora	Indian National Congress
1972	Kantaben Shah	Indian National Congress
1978	Pranlal Vora	Janata Party
1980	Pranlal Vora	Janata Party
1985	Hans Bhugra	Indian National Congress
1987^	Ramesh Prabhoo	Independent
1990	Ramesh Prabhoo	Shiv Sena
1995	Gurunath Desai	Shiv Sena
1999	Vinayak Raut	Shiv Sena
2004	Ashok Jadhav	Indian National Congress
2009	Krishna Hegde	Indian National Congress
2014	Parag Alavani	Bharatiya Janata Party
2019	Parag Alavani	Bharatiya Janata Party
2024	Parag Alavani	Bharatiya Janata Party

^by-election

== Election results ==
=== Assembly Election 2024 ===
2024 Maharashtra Legislative Assembly election : Vile Parle
Party	Candidate	Votes	%	±%
BJP	Parag Madhusudan Alavani	97,259	62.60	▼0.37
SS(UBT)	Sandeep Raju Naik	42,324	27.24	New
MNS	Juilee Omkar Shende	12,123	7.80	▼5.83
NOTA	None of the Above	2,255	1.45	▼1.72
VBA	Santosh Ganpat Ambulge	2,201	1.42	▼1.45
Margin of victory		54,935	35.36	▼7.93
Turnout		157,628	57.25	▲4.15
Total valid votes		155,373		
Registered electors		275,347		▲4.96
BJP hold		Swing	▼0.37	

=== Assembly Election 2019 ===
2019 Maharashtra Legislative Assembly election : Vile Parle
Party	Candidate	Votes	%	±%
BJP	Parag Madhusudan Alavani	84,991	62.96	▲13.48
INC	Jayanti Jivabhai Siroya	26,564	19.68	▲3.56
MNS	Juilee Omkar Shende	18,406	13.64	▲9.72
NOTA	None of the Above	4,286	3.18	▲2.17
VBA	Sundarrao Baburao Padmukh	3,867	2.86	New
Independent	Rajendra Dayaram Nandagawali	812	0.60	New
Margin of victory		58,427	43.28	▲21.67
Turnout		139,296	53.10	▲0.64
Total valid votes		134,986		
Registered electors		262,346		▼8.32
BJP hold		Swing	▲13.48	

=== Assembly Election 2014 ===
2014 Maharashtra Legislative Assembly election : Vile Parle
Party	Candidate	Votes	%	±%
BJP	Parag Madhusudan Alavani	74,270	49.48	New
SS	Shashikant Govind Patkar	41,835	27.87	▼4.77
INC	Krishna Hegde	24,191	16.12	▼17.82
MNS	Suhas Narayan Shinde	5,882	3.92	▼22.99
Independent	Adv. Godfrey William Pimenta	1,733	1.15	New
NOTA	None of the Above	1,513	1.01	New
Margin of victory		32,435	21.61	▲20.30
Turnout		151,613	52.98	▲4.49
Total valid votes		150,099		
Registered electors		286,158		▲5.06
BJP gain from INC		Swing	▲15.54	

=== Assembly Election 2009 ===
2009 Maharashtra Legislative Assembly election : Vile Parle
Party	Candidate	Votes	%	±%
INC	Krishna Hegde	44,338	33.94	▼15.62
SS	Vinayak Bhaurao Raut	42,634	32.64	▼9.03
MNS	Parkar Shirish Laxman	35,156	26.91	New
Independent	Nicholas Hillary @ Benjamin Almeida	2,285	1.75	New
RPI(A)	Kakasaheb Dashrath Khambalkar	2,022	1.55	New
Hindustani Swaraj Party	Yasin Abdul Khan	1,162	0.89	New
BSP	Moses John	972	0.74	▼0.01
Margin of victory		1,704	1.30	▼6.58
Turnout		130,634	47.96	▼2.73
Total valid votes		130,630		
Registered electors		272,381		▲21.23
INC hold		Swing	▼15.62	

=== Assembly Election 2004 ===
2004 Maharashtra Legislative Assembly election : Vile Parle
Party	Candidate	Votes	%	±%
INC	Ashok Bhau Jadhav	56,436	49.56	▲5.63
SS	Vinayak Bhaurao Raut	47,453	41.67	▼3.97
Independent	Ramesh Prabhoo	7,114	6.25	New
BSP	Kamlesh Nair	859	0.75	▲0.04
Independent	Shisatkar Arvind Ramchandra	761	0.67	New
Margin of victory		8,983	7.89	▲6.17
Turnout		113,882	50.69	▲3.82
Total valid votes		113,880		
Registered electors		224,675		▲5.63
INC gain from SS		Swing	▲3.92	

=== Assembly Election 1999 ===
1999 Maharashtra Legislative Assembly election : Vile Parle
Party	Candidate	Votes	%	±%
SS	Vinayak Bhaurao Raut	45,499	45.64	▼10.26
INC	Ashok Bhau Jadhav	43,790	43.92	▲12.30
NCP	Pushpakant Anant Mhatre	8,959	8.99	New
BSP	Brijbhan Sahani	714	0.72	▼3.35
Margin of victory		1,709	1.71	▼22.56
Turnout		101,752	47.84	▼13.02
Total valid votes		99,696		
Registered electors		212,707		▲7.34
SS hold		Swing	▼10.26	

=== Assembly Election 1995 ===
1995 Maharashtra Legislative Assembly election : Vile Parle
Party	Candidate	Votes	%	±%
SS	Gurunath Krishna Desai	66,333	55.90	▲10.10
INC	Jitendra Gulab Joshi	37,528	31.62	▼0.88
BSP	Lalji Ramkishor Yadav	4,827	4.07	New
JP	C. R. Pawar	1,769	1.49	New
JD	Subhedar Roopnarayan	1,573	1.33	▼18.13
Independent	Kamlesh K. Nair	1,425	1.20	New
Independent	Kanji Walji Shah	1,137	0.96	New
Margin of victory		28,805	24.27	▲10.98
Turnout		120,617	60.87	▲8.83
Total valid votes		118,673		
Registered electors		198,162		▲4.33
SS hold		Swing	▲10.10	

=== Assembly Election 1990 ===
1990 Maharashtra Legislative Assembly election : Vile Parle
Party	Candidate	Votes	%	±%
SS	Dr. Ramesh Yashsant Prabhoo	44,408	45.79	New
INC	Pushpakant Anant Mhatre	31,520	32.50	New
JD	Vashi Manubhai P.	18,866	19.46	New
Independent	Devendra Gulab Joshi	720	0.74	New
Margin of victory		12,888	13.29	
Turnout		97,928	51.56	
Total valid votes		96,972		
Registered electors		189,932		
SS gain from Independent		Swing		

=== Assembly By-election 1987 ===
1987 Maharashtra Legislative Assembly by-election : Vile Parle
Party	Candidate	Votes	%	±%
Independent	Dr. Ramesh Yashsant Prabhoo	29,574		New
INC	P. Kunte	18,783		
Margin of victory		10,791		
Turnout				
Total valid votes		0		
Independent gain from INC		Swing		

=== Assembly Election 1985 ===
1985 Maharashtra Legislative Assembly election : Vile Parle
Party	Candidate	Votes	%	±%
INC	Hans Bhugra	27,500	49.70	New
JP	Pranlal Vora	25,231	45.60	▼11.06
Independent	Vanita Patel	1,261	2.28	New
Independent	Linesh Sheth	552	1.00	New
Independent	Ashok Jain	387	0.70	New
Margin of victory		2,269	4.10	▼10.28
Turnout		55,972	37.75	▲5.66
Total valid votes		55,331		
Registered electors		148,272		▲9.82
INC gain from JP		Swing	▼6.96	

=== Assembly Election 1980 ===
1980 Maharashtra Legislative Assembly election : Vile Parle
Party	Candidate	Votes	%	±%
JP	Pranlal Vora	24,215	56.66	▼9.95
INC(I)	Dinesh Mehta	18,067	42.27	▲29.12
[[Janata Party (Secular) Raj Narain|Janata Party (Secular) Raj Narain]]	Singh Subhedar Roopnarayan	456	1.07	New
Margin of victory		6,148	14.39	▼38.32
Turnout		43,200	32.00	▼24.34
Total valid votes		42,738		
Registered electors		135,013		▲8.56
JP hold		Swing	▼9.95	

=== Assembly Election 1978 ===
1978 Maharashtra Legislative Assembly election : Vile Parle
Party	Candidate	Votes	%	±%
JP	Pranlal Vora	46,382	66.60	New
INC	Pushpakant Anant Mhatre	9,680	13.90	▼38.69
INC(I)	Harihar Shelat	9,161	13.16	New
SS	Rajaram Yeshwant Gadekar	4,415	6.34	▼8.21
Margin of victory		36,702	52.70	▲19.86
Turnout		70,592	56.76	▼4.46
Total valid votes		69,638		
Registered electors		124,372		▲0.02
JP gain from INC		Swing	▲14.02	

=== Assembly Election 1972 ===
1972 Maharashtra Legislative Assembly election : Vile Parle
Party	Candidate	Votes	%	±%
INC	Chandulal Shah Kantaben	39,531	52.59	▲11.78
INC(O)	Pranlal Harkishandas Vora	14,841	19.74	New
SS	Padmakar K. Dhamdhere	10,941	14.55	New
ABJS	Ruiya Purushottam Gopiram	9,256	12.31	▼0.93
Independent	Rangnath D. Suryawanshi	603	0.80	New
Margin of victory		24,690	32.84	▲8.31
Turnout		76,768	61.73	▼1.92
Total valid votes		75,172		
Registered electors		124,353		▲30.26
INC hold		Swing	▲11.78	

=== Assembly Election 1967 ===
1967 Maharashtra Legislative Assembly election : Vile Parle
Party	Candidate	Votes	%	±%
INC	Pranlal Vora	24,298	40.81	New
Independent	K. H. Deodhar	9,690	16.28	New
ABJS	N. B. Shende	7,884	13.24	New
PSP	V. N. Gupte	6,886	11.57	New
Independent	R. N. Desai	5,913	9.93	New
Independent	R. R. Chomal	4,484	7.53	New
Independent	S. M. Mohammad	382	0.64	New
Margin of victory		14,608	24.54	
Turnout		63,175	66.18	
Total valid votes		59,537		
Registered electors		95,462		
INC win (new seat)				

== See also ==
- Vile Parle
- List of constituencies of Maharashtra Vidhan Sabha
