= Naseem Khan (politician) =

Indian politician

Mohammed Arif Naseem Khan

Working President of Maharashtra Pradesh Congress Committee
- Incumbent
- Assumed office 7 March 2021
- State President Indian National Congress: Nana Patole

Cabinet Minister Government of Maharashtra
- In office 7 November 2009 – 26 September 2014
- Minister: Textiles; Minority Development & Aukaf; Ex-Servicemen's Welfare
- Governor: S. C. Jamir; Om Prakash Kohli (additional charge) *K. Sankaranarayanan; C. Vidyasagar Rao
- Chief Minister: Ashok Chavan
- Preceded by: -
- Succeeded by: Ram Shinde; Vinod Tawde; Sambhaji Patil Nilangekar

Guardian minister of Mumbai Suburban District Government of Maharashtra
- In office 7 November 2009 – 26 September 2014
- Constituency: Chandivali

Member of Legislative Assembly Maharashtra
- In office 16 October 2014 – 30 October 2019
- Preceded by: Himself
- Succeeded by: Dilip Lande
- Constituency: Chandivali
- In office 13 October 2009 – 15 October 2014
- Preceded by: New Seat
- Succeeded by: Himself
- Constituency: Chandivali
- In office 16 November 2004 – 14 October 2009
- Preceded by: Himself
- Succeeded by: Milind Kamble
- Constituency: Kurla
- In office 7 October 1999 – 16 November 2004
- Preceded by: Shantaram Chavan
- Succeeded by: Himself
- Constituency: Kurla

Personal details
- Born: 1963 (age 62–63)
- Party: Indian National Congress

Mohammed Arif (Naseem) Khan (born 21 October 1963) is an Indian politician with the Indian National Congress and vice president of Maharashtra Pradesh Congress Committee (MPCC).

Minister of Textiles, Aukaf and Minorities Development and Guardian Minister of Mumbai Suburban District in the Government of Maharashtra.

Mohammed Arif Naseem Khan was the first Muslim to be Minister of State for Home (Urban) of Maharashtra since the state came into existence in 1960.

Mohammad Arif Naseem Khan was awarded with Best MLA Award given by Kashmir to Kerala Foundation with the hands of Deputy Chairman Rajya Sabha Shri Koriyan and Justice Kamal Pasha on 15 January 2017.

Arif Naseem Khan has been officially nominated by the Congress to contest the 2024 Maharashtra Assembly elections from the Chandivali seat. Arif Nasim had won the Chandivali seat in 2009 and 2014. He however lost the 2019 assembly election from this seat by just 409 votes.

== Members of Legislative Assembly ==
Kurla

Key

INC JP Independent SS NCP

Election	Member	Party
1962	Anjanabai Magar	Indian National Congress
1967	T. R. Naravane	Indian National Congress
1972	Prabhakar Kunte	Indian National Congress
1978	Shamsul Haq Khan	Janata Party
1980	Datta Samant	Independent
1985	Selin D'Silva	Indian National Congress
1990	Ramakant Mayekar	Shiv Sena
1995	Shantaram Chavan	Shiv Sena
1999	Mohammed Arif (Naseem) Khan	Indian National Congress
2004	Mohammed Arif (Naseem) Khan	Indian National Congress

== Members of Legislative Assembly ==
Chandivali

Key

INC

Election	Member	Party
2009	Mohammed Arif (Naseem) Khan	Indian National Congress
2014	Mohammed Arif (Naseem) Khan	Indian National Congress
