= Kurla Assembly constituency =

Constituency of the Maharashtra legislative assembly in India

Coordinates: 19.073°N 72.882°E

Kurla
- Constituency No. 174 for the Maharashtra Legislative Assembly

Constituency details
- Country: India
- Region: Western India
- State: Maharashtra
- District: Mumbai Suburban
- Lok Sabha constituency: Mumbai North Central
- Established: 1955
- Total electors: 292,275
- Reservation: SC

Member of Legislative Assembly
- 15th Maharashtra Legislative Assembly
- Incumbent Mangesh Kudalkar
- Party: SHS
- Alliance: NDA
- Elected year: 2024

Kurla Assembly constituency is one of the 288 Vidhan Sabha constituencies of Maharashtra state in western India. This constituency presently, after delimitation of Legislative Assembly constituencies in 2008, is reserved for the candidates belonging to the Scheduled Castes.

== Overview ==
Kurla (constituency number 174) is one of the 26 Vidhan Sabha constituencies located in the Mumbai Suburban district. The number of electorates in 2009 was 284,951 (male 161,459, female 123,492).

Kurla is part of the Mumbai North Central Lok Sabha constituency along with five other Vidhan Sabha segments, namely Vile Parle, Chandivali, Kalina, Vandre West and Vandre East in the Mumbai Suburban district.

== Members of the Legislative Assembly ==
Year	Member	Party
1957	Anjanabai Narhar Magar	Indian National Congress
1962	Anjanabai Narhar Magar	Indian National Congress
1967	T. R. Naravane	Indian National Congress
1972	Prabhakar Kashinath Kunte	Indian National Congress
1978	Khan Shamsul Haq	Janata Party
1980	Dutta Samant	Independent politician
1985	Celine D. Silva	Indian National Congress
1990	Mayekar Ramakant Shankar	Shiv Sena
1995	Chavan Shantaram Sitaram	Shiv Sena
1999	Mohammed Arif Naseem Khan	Indian National Congress
2004	Mohammed Arif Naseem Khan	Indian National Congress
2009	Milind Anna Kamble	Nationalist Congress Party
2014	Mangesh Kudalkar	Shiv Sena
2019	Mangesh Kudalkar	Shiv Sena
2024	Mangesh Kudalkar	Shiv Sena

== Election results ==
=== Assembly Election 2024 ===
2024 Maharashtra Legislative Assembly election : Kurla
Party	Candidate	Votes	%	±%
SS	Mangesh Kudalkar	72,763	47.04	▲0.74
SS(UBT)	Pravina Manish Morajkar	68,576	44.33	New
AIMIM	Adv. Asma Shaikh	3,945	2.55	▼12.04
MNS	Pradeep Sampat Waghmare	3,197	2.07	▼6.15
VBA	Swapnil Rajendra Jawalgekar	3,005	1.94	New
NOTA	None of the Above	1,594	1.03	▼2.77
Independent	Dr. Jyotsna Bhanudas Jadhav	982	0.63	New
Margin of victory		4,187	2.71	▼14.96
Turnout		156,292	53.47	▲9.66
Total valid votes		154,698		
Registered electors		292,275		▲6.35
SS hold		Swing	▲0.74	

=== Assembly Election 2019 ===
2019 Maharashtra Legislative Assembly election : Kurla
Party	Candidate	Votes	%	±%
SS	Mangesh Kudalkar	55,049	46.29	▲14.97
NCP	Milind Anna Kamble	34,036	28.62	▲17.93
AIMIM	Adv. Ratnakar Dynanu Davare	17,349	14.59	▼4.80
MNS	Appasaheb Anandarao Avchare	9,771	8.22	▲4.05
NOTA	None of the Above	4,521	3.80	▲2.90
BSP	Nitin Gangaram Bhosale	1,979	1.66	▲0.25
API	Ganesh Ankush Shinde	729	0.61	New
Margin of victory		21,013	17.67	▲8.12
Turnout		123,456	44.92	▼2.43
Total valid votes		118,913		
Registered electors		274,813		▼5.39
SS hold		Swing	▲14.97	

=== Assembly Election 2014 ===
2014 Maharashtra Legislative Assembly election : Kurla
Party	Candidate	Votes	%	±%
SS	Mangesh Kudalkar	41,580	31.32	▲2.51
BJP	Vijay Baburao Kamble	28,901	21.77	New
AIMIM	Avinash Gopichand Barve	25,741	19.39	New
NCP	Milind (Anna) Kamble	14,194	10.69	▼23.87
INC	Bramhanand Govind Shinde (B.G.)	12,855	9.68	New
MNS	Snehal Sudhir Jadhav	5,529	4.16	▼23.86
BSP	C. K. Jadhav	1,877	1.41	▼0.35
NOTA	None of the Above	1,195	0.90	New
Margin of victory		12,679	9.55	▲3.80
Turnout		133,966	46.12	▲3.17
Total valid votes		132,761		
Registered electors		290,484		▲1.94
SS gain from NCP		Swing	▼3.24	

=== Assembly Election 2009 ===
2009 Maharashtra Legislative Assembly election : Kurla
Party	Candidate	Votes	%	±%
NCP	Milind Anna Kamble	41,891	34.56	New
SS	Mangesh Kudalkar	34,920	28.81	▼6.88
MNS	Lokhande Sadashiv Kisan	33,967	28.03	New
RPI(A)	Avinash Mahatekar	5,016	4.14	New
BSP	Lokhande Rajesh Laxman	2,132	1.76	▼0.82
Independent	Gazi Sadodin Zahir Ahmed	1,000	0.83	New
Independent	Chandrakant Kondiba Prabhale	933	0.77	New
Margin of victory		6,971	5.75	▼13.92
Turnout		121,201	42.53	▼0.81
Total valid votes		121,198		
Registered electors		284,951		▼42.83
NCP gain from INC		Swing	▼20.80	

=== Assembly Election 2004 ===
2004 Maharashtra Legislative Assembly election : Kurla
Party	Candidate	Votes	%	±%
INC	Mohammed Arif Naseem Khan	119,612	55.36	▲9.81
SS	Dattaram Gujar	77,119	35.69	▲2.18
BSP	Deepak More	5,571	2.58	▲0.81
Independent	Chandan Chittaranjan Sharma	3,549	1.64	New
SP	Ahsanulla Khan	3,173	1.47	New
Independent	Sandeep Prabhakar Yeole	2,342	1.08	New
Independent	Vivek Pandit	1,655	0.77	New
Margin of victory		42,493	19.67	▲7.62
Turnout		216,067	43.35	▼1.56
Total valid votes		216,065		
Registered electors		498,470		▲17.12
INC hold		Swing	▲9.81	

=== Assembly Election 1999 ===
1999 Maharashtra Legislative Assembly election : Kurla
Party	Candidate	Votes	%	±%
INC	Mohammed Arif Naseem Khan	87,066	45.55	▲23.38
SS	Shantaram Sitaram Chauhan	64,045	33.51	▼12.75
NCP	Shivajirao Vishnu Nalavade	32,225	16.86	New
BSP	Gupta Shivnath Kalika	3,379	1.77	New
Independent	Wahul Vilas Karbhari	1,386	0.73	New
Margin of victory		23,021	12.04	▼12.04
Turnout		191,135	44.91	▼10.37
Total valid votes		191,128		
Registered electors		425,610		▲4.30
INC gain from SS		Swing	▼0.70	

=== Assembly Election 1995 ===
1995 Maharashtra Legislative Assembly election : Kurla
Party	Candidate	Votes	%	±%
SS	Chavan Shantaram Sitaram	104,332	46.26	▲5.74
INC	Maske Dayanand Jagannath	50,010	22.17	▼15.06
SP	Yadav Shyamnarain	36,849	16.34	New
Independent	Ishaq Bhai Sarguro	8,645	3.83	New
Independent	Varghese Chacko	7,150	3.17	New
JD	Imran Khan	3,703	1.64	▼18.52
Independent	S. N. Alee	2,523	1.12	New
Margin of victory		54,322	24.08	▲20.80
Turnout		229,272	56.19	▲2.01
Total valid votes		225,543		
Registered electors		408,053		▲35.90
SS hold		Swing	▲5.74	

=== Assembly Election 1990 ===
1990 Maharashtra Legislative Assembly election : Kurla
Party	Candidate	Votes	%	±%
SS	Mayekar Ramakant Shankar	64,794	40.51	New
INC	Celine D. Silva	59,543	37.23	▼1.76
JD	Chittaranjan Sharma	32,248	20.16	New
Independent	Sherkhan K. A.	1,404	0.88	New
Margin of victory		5,251	3.28	▼18.57
Turnout		161,888	53.92	▲7.31
Total valid votes		159,928		
Registered electors		300,263		▲29.71
SS gain from INC		Swing	▲1.53	

=== Assembly Election 1985 ===
1985 Maharashtra Legislative Assembly election : Kurla
Party	Candidate	Votes	%	±%
INC	Celine D. Silva	41,472	38.99	New
Independent	Chavan Shantaram Sitaram	18,222	17.13	New
IC(S)	Shiwaji Nalawade	14,136	13.29	New
Independent	Baliram Savant	11,937	11.22	New
Independent	Abdul Bari Farooqui	9,513	8.94	New
Independent	Abul Wafa Laddan	5,834	5.48	New
LKD	Khan Subhan Bharti	1,834	1.72	New
Margin of victory		23,250	21.86	▲11.69
Turnout		107,814	46.57	▲4.99
Total valid votes		106,376		
Registered electors		231,486		▲37.16
INC gain from Independent		Swing	▼3.55	

=== Assembly Election 1980 ===
1980 Maharashtra Legislative Assembly election : Kurla
Party	Candidate	Votes	%	±%
Independent	Dutta Samant	29,410	42.53	New
INC(I)	Celine D. Silva	22,383	32.37	▲16.69
BJP	Shamsul Haq Khan	9,518	13.77	New
JP	A. C. Narayan	4,722	6.83	▼29.41
RPI	Sheshrao Dongre	2,760	3.99	New
Margin of victory		7,027	10.16	▼0.76
Turnout		70,018	41.49	▼23.20
Total valid votes		69,145		
Registered electors		168,776		▲16.12
Independent gain from JP		Swing	▲6.29	

=== Assembly Election 1978 ===
1978 Maharashtra Legislative Assembly election : Kurla
Party	Candidate	Votes	%	±%
JP	Khan Shamsul Haq	33,800	36.24	New
INC	Dutta Samant	23,617	25.32	▼33.50
SS	Joshi Sudhir	19,379	20.78	▲7.18
INC(I)	K. A. Sherkhan	14,624	15.68	New
Independent	Kirat Kudev Vithal Shankar	1,484	1.59	New
Margin of victory		10,183	10.92	▼34.30
Turnout		95,113	65.44	▲5.31
Total valid votes		93,261		
Registered electors		145,340		▼1.77
JP gain from INC		Swing	▼22.58	

=== Assembly Election 1972 ===
1972 Maharashtra Legislative Assembly election : Kurla
Party	Candidate	Votes	%	±%
INC	Prabhakar Kashinath Kunte	51,220	58.82	▲28.53
SS	Leeladhar Balaji Dake	11,842	13.60	New
RPI	Gangurde Krishnarao Ragho	11,523	13.23	▼6.93
SSP	Sohansingh Kohali	11,424	13.12	New
Independent	Madhav Girjaji More	876	1.01	New
Margin of victory		39,378	45.22	▲35.10
Turnout		89,125	60.24	▼3.28
Total valid votes		87,077		
Registered electors		147,955		▲52.17
INC hold		Swing	▲28.53	

=== Assembly Election 1967 ===
1967 Maharashtra Legislative Assembly election : Kurla
Party	Candidate	Votes	%	±%
INC	T. R. Naravane	18,301	30.29	▼15.37
RPI	K. R. Gangurde	12,184	20.17	▼12.8
Independent	M. S. Khanolkar	9,449	15.64	New
ABJS	D. B. Surve	8,399	13.90	New
Independent	B. A. Buchayya	4,539	7.51	New
Independent	N. P. Nikumbh	3,812	6.31	New
Independent	M. S. Bright Mahind	2,322	3.84	New
Margin of victory		6,117	10.12	▼2.57
Turnout		64,156	65.98	▲3.03
Total valid votes		60,418		
Registered electors		97,233		▼23.16
INC hold		Swing	▼15.37	

=== Assembly Election 1962 ===
1962 Maharashtra Legislative Assembly election : Kurla
Party	Candidate	Votes	%	±%
INC	Anjanabai Narhar Magar	34,153	45.66	▼6.3
RPI	Manoharlal Mangalsain Marwah	24,656	32.96	New
Independent	Bhalchandra Anaji Sawant	6,149	8.22	New
Independent	Vajidayarkhan Hadiyarkhan Khan	5,386	7.20	New
Independent	Govindrao Baburao Pawar	3,253	4.35	New
Independent	Ramji Shivnarayan	1,198	1.60	New
Margin of victory		9,497	12.70	▲2.48
Turnout		78,235	61.83	▼7.27
Total valid votes		74,795		
Registered electors		126,537		▲65.25
INC hold		Swing	▼6.30	

=== Assembly Election 1957 ===
1957 Bombay State Legislative Assembly election : Kurla
Party	Candidate	Votes	%	±%
INC	Magar Anjanabai Narhar	26,409	51.96	New
Independent	Sule Vasantrao Vishwanath	21,214	41.74	New
Independent	Bagaiokar Sadashiv Shankar	2,055	4.04	New
Independent	Mangoli Gousmohiuddin Hussainsa	838	1.65	New
Independent	Ansari Hidayatulla Ruhullah	310	0.61	New
Margin of victory		5,195	10.22	New
Turnout		50,826	66.38	New
Total valid votes		50,826		
Registered electors		76,573		New
INC hold		Swing	{{{swing}}}	

== See also ==
- Kurla
- List of constituencies of Maharashtra Vidhan Sabha
