= Dilip Lande =

Indian politician

Member of the Maharashtra Legislative Assembly
- Incumbent
- Assumed office October 2019
- Preceded by: Naseem Khan
- Constituency: Chandivali

Personal details
- Born: 24 October 1961 (age 64)
- Party: Shiv Sena

Dilip Lande, popularly called Mama Lande, is an Indian politician currently serving as a Member of the Maharashtra Legislative Assembly from the Chandivali constituency. He has won the elections from this constituency for two consecutive terms. He is a member of the political party, Shiv Sena (Shinde group). He is from Mumbai Maharashtra.

Born on October 24, 1961, in Mumbai, Maharashtra, Lande has been actively involved in politics for several years. He was first elected as a corporator in the Brihanmumbai Municipal Corporation in 2012 and was re-elected in 2017.

Lande has a background in business and social work. He holds a degree in commerce from Yashwantrao Chavan Maharashtra Open University, which he completed in 2008.

== Positions held ==
- 2012: Elected as corporator in Brihanmumbai Municipal Corporation from L Ward under the Maharashtra Navnirman Sena party symbol
- 2017: Re-Elected as corporator in Brihanmumbai Municipal Corporation
- 2019: Elected to Maharashtra Legislative Assembly
- 2024: Re-elected to Maharashtra Legislative Assembly
