= Paranath Avtar =

Poetic composition

Parasnath Avtar
- ← Datta Avtar Shabad Hazare →
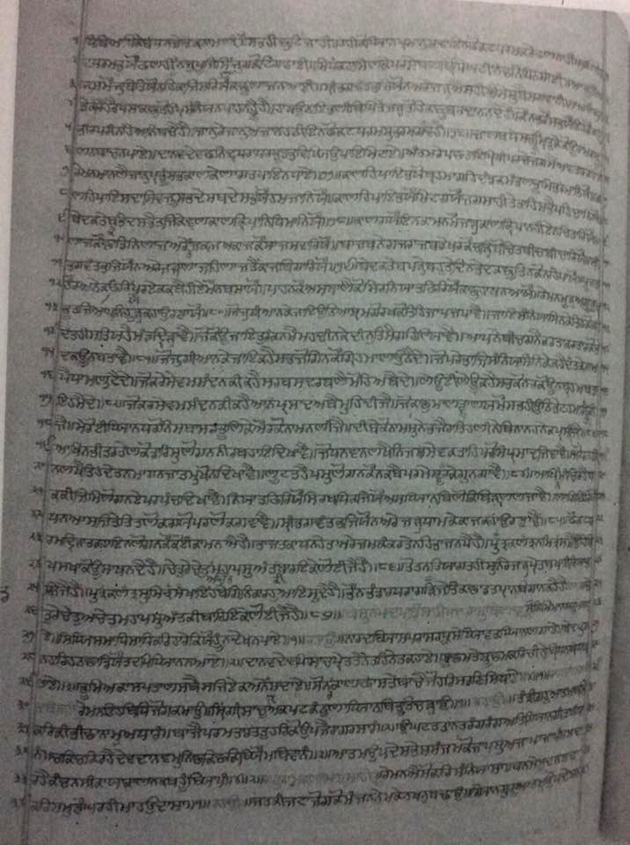
- Concluding portion of Paras Nath Avatar and opening verses of Shabad Hazare (also known as Shabad Patshahi 10) - from the Anandpuri Hazuri bir (manuscript) of the Dasam Granth dated to 1698

Information
- Religion: Sikhism
- Author: Guru Gobind Singh
- Verses: 358 chhands

Paranath or Parasnath Avtar is a composition, within the Rudra Avtar, written by Guru Gobind Singh, which is present in the Dasam Granth.

== Synopsis ==
It is the second of the two chapters of the Rudra Avtar, with the preceding chapter covering Datta Avtar. The composition has 358 Channds. The composition is about the life history of Parasnath and his discourse with Matsyendranath. The composition is succeeded in sequence by Sabhad Hazare Patshahi 10. Unlike Chandi Charitar and Krishna Avtar, the source of narration of Parasnath Avtar is not any of the 36 Puranas. This narration is most likely about the 23rd Tirthankara, Parshwanath of Jainism as the narration is about internal struggle, which resembles with Jainism.

Parasnath is described as venerating Durga in verses no.45–89 of the chapter.

== Internal Struggle ==
This composition contains an internal contest between Bibek (or discernment) and Abibek (or ignorance), which explains the warriors of Dharma and Adharma. All vices and virtues are shown in the form of warriors which fight in battle.
