= Ramesh Prabhoo =

Indian politician

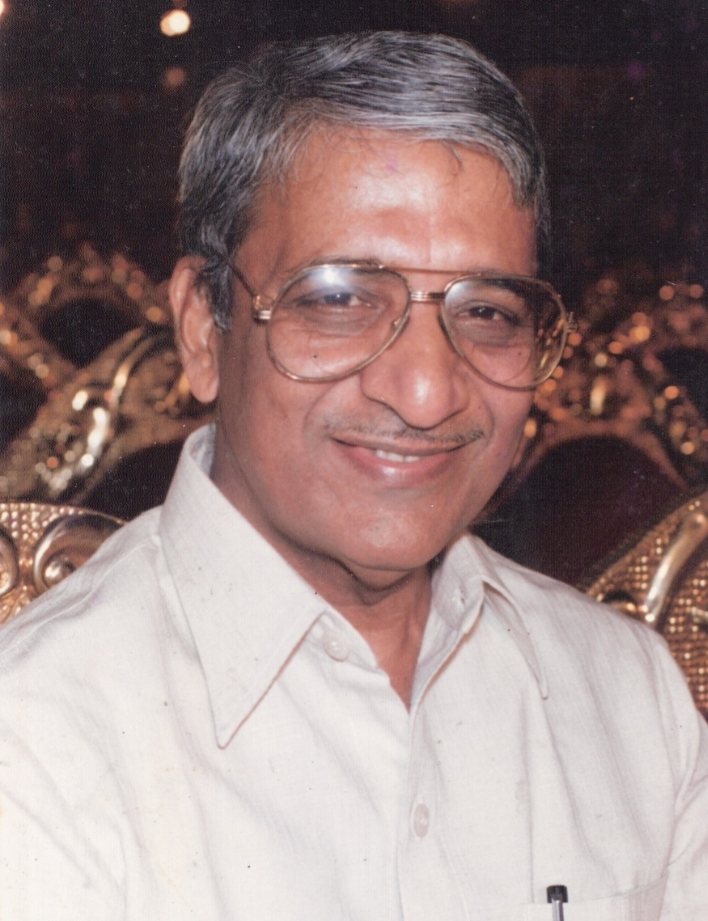

Dr. Ramesh Y. Prabhoo MBBS (17 May 1939 – 11 December 2016) ) was a physician. He attended Wilson College in Mumbai and received his MBBS from Grant Medical College in Mumbai. He joined the Shiv Sena in 1969 and served the city of Mumbai for over 40 years by becoming three-time stockholder, two-time MLA and the Mayor of Mumbai (1987–88). He had won many awards and is a recipient of Parle Bhushan.

Yeshwantrao S. Prabhoo, a businessman, and Sumitra Y. Prabhoo are his parents. He married his classmate, Dr. Pushpa R. Prabhoo (daughter of then Member of Parliament, Hon. Sri Ganapatrao Tapase) in 1964, and moved to Vile Parle Mumbai Suburbs, where he started his private practice.

They have three children, Commander Rajendra R. Prabhoo, Arvind R. Prabhoo, and Leena R. Prabhoo.

During his active career, he initiated the construction of Dinanath Mangeshkar Natyagruha, Babasaheb Gawde Hospital, Shirodkar Hospital, Prabodhankar Thackeray Krida Sankul and Joggers Park (1996), and Veer Savarkar Seva Kendra in Vile Parle (East). He is the founder of the Chhatrapati Shivaji Maharaj Smarak Samittee, which erected the Chhatrapati Shivaji Maharaj Statue in Juhu. He was the President of the Vijay Merchant Rehabilitation Center, which provided employment to thousands of physically challenged individuals.

He organized numerous camps for blood donation, polio vaccination, and health check-up where lakhs of citizens participated and availed the help they needed.

He planted trees in Vile Parle as part of Lions and Rotary Club projects. On his initiative, a picture of Sri Veer Savarkar was erected in the Indian Parliament on February 26, 2003, by the President of India, Hon. Sri A.P. J. Abdul Kalamji, in the presence of the Hon. Prime Minister of India, Sri Atal Bihari Vajpayee Ji, and other dignitaries. A delegation of 250 people went to Marseilles to commemorate the hundredth year of the historic jump of Veer Savarkar in 2008.

Dr. Ramesh Yeshwant Prabhoo was also a politician. In 1987 he was elected as a member of Maharashtra's legislative assembly as an independent candidate supported by the Shiv Sena,. His election was annulled by a judgement handed down from the Supreme Court of India which upheld a lower court order, for election speeches made by the chief of the Shiv Sena, Bal Thackeray.

Dr. Prabhoo had to vacate his electoral seat and was barred from contesting elections, along with Balasaheb Thackeray, for six years. Following this directive, the BJP and Shiv Sena formed an alliance that lasted for over twenty-five years. Dr. Prabhoo was the Mayor of Mumbai from 1987 until 1988.
