= Avtar Singh Rikhy =

Indian civil servant

Shri Avtar Singh Rikhy
- Born: 23 December 1923 (age 102); Lahore, Pakistan
- Education: Punjab University and University of Calcutta

Avtar Singh Rikhy (born 23 December 1923) was an Indian civil servant who was the former Secretary-General of the 6th Lok Sabha and 7th Lok Sabha (Lower House of Parliament of India). He succeeded Shri S. L. Shakdhar after his appointment as the Chief Election Commissioner.

== Early life ==
Sardar Rikhy had his higher education from Punjab University and Calcutta University. He was Double M.A. in History and English. He stood third in order of merit in the Punjab University in M.A. (English) 1945; diploma in Journalism, Punjab University 1944; diploma in Social Work (Welfare), Calcutta University, 1948 where he stood second in order of merit; after being successful in the All-India Combined Services Competitive Examination, 1945 served in various administrative capacities in the government, 1946–1956.

== Positions held ==
- Deputy Secretary, Lok Sabha, 1956–69
- Joint Secretary, Lok Sabha, 1969–74
- Additional Secretary, 1974–77
- Secretary, Lok Sabha, 1977–83
- Secretary-General, Lok Sabha, 22-31 Dec 1983
