= Nirmla Kumari Shaktawat =

Indian politician

Nirmla Kumari Shaktawat is a former member of Lok Sabha. She represented Chittorgarh twice elected as candidate of Indian National Congress. She was born in 1938 and had studied at M.B. College, Udaipur. She served as professor of sociology at University of Rajasthan from 1961 to 1972. In 1972 she entered politics and was elected to Rajasthan Legislative Assembly. She was elected to the seventh and 8th Lok Sabha in 1980 and again in 1984.
