= Kalina Assembly constituency =

Constituency of the Maharashtra legislative assembly in India

Coordinates: 19.073°N 72.863°E

Kalina
- Constituency No. 175 for the Maharashtra Legislative Assembly

Constituency details
- Country: India
- Region: Western India
- State: Maharashtra
- District: Mumbai Suburban
- Lok Sabha constituency: Mumbai North Central
- Established: 2008
- Total electors: 241,753
- Reservation: None

Member of Legislative Assembly
- 15th Maharashtra Legislative Assembly
- Incumbent Sanjay Potnis
- Party: SS(UBT)
- Alliance: MVA
- Elected year: 2024

Kalina Assembly constituency is one of the 288 Vidhan Sabha constituencies of Maharashtra state in western India.

== Overview ==
Kalina (constituency number 175) is one of the 26 Vidhan Sabha constituencies located in the Mumbai Suburban district. The number of electorates in 2009 was 257,576 (male 144,501, female 113,075).

Kalina is part of the Mumbai North Central Lok Sabha constituency along with five other Vidhan Sabha segments, namely Vile Parle, Chandivali, Kurla, Vandre West and Vandre East in the Mumbai Suburban district.

== Members of the Legislative Assembly ==
Year	Member	Party
Until 2008: See Santacruz
2009	Kripashankar Singh	Indian National Congress
2014	Sanjay Potnis	Shiv Sena
2019	Sanjay Potnis	Shiv Sena
2024	Sanjay Potnis	Shiv Sena (UBT)

== Election results ==
=== Assembly Election 2024 ===
2024 Maharashtra Legislative Assembly election : Kalina
Party	Candidate	Votes	%	±%
SS(UBT)	Sanjay Potnis	59,820	47.41	New
BJP	Amarjeet Awadhnarayan Singh	54,812	43.44	New
MNS	Balkrishna Hutgi	6,062	4.80	▼14.58
NOTA	None of the Above	1,667	1.32	▼1.29
VBA	Mohammad Luqman Siddiqui	1,346	1.07	▼1.51
BSP	Gangurde Sushila Sunil	1,255	0.99	New
Margin of victory		5,008	3.97	▼0.30
Turnout		1,27,844	52.88	▲3.56
Total valid votes		1,26,177		
Registered electors		2,41,753		▲1.72
SS(UBT) gain from SS		Swing	▲9.93	

=== Assembly Election 2019 ===
2019 Maharashtra Legislative Assembly election : Kalina
Party	Candidate	Votes	%	±%
SS	Sanjay Potnis	43,319	37.48	▲12.93
INC	George Abraham	38,388	33.22	▲14.35
MNS	Sanjay Ramchandra Turde	22,405	19.39	▲10.03
NOTA	None of the Above	3,012	2.61	▲1.19
VBA	Manisha Sachin Jadhav	2,979	2.58	New
AIMIM	Mohammed Sufiyan Sayed	2,637	2.28	New
Independent	Javed Mohammad Rafique Shaikh	1,496	1.29	New
SP	Ismail Ibrahim Shaikh	1,250	1.08	New
Margin of victory		4,931	4.27	▲3.23
Turnout		1,18,592	49.90	▼0.81
Total valid votes		1,15,569		
Registered electors		2,37,655		▼6.06
SS hold		Swing	▲12.93	

=== Assembly Election 2014 ===
2014 Maharashtra Legislative Assembly election : Kalina
Party	Candidate	Votes	%	±%
SS	Sanjay Potnis	30,715	24.56	New
BJP	Singh Amarjeet Awadhnarayan	29,418	23.52	▲11.58
INC	Kripashankar Singh	23,595	18.86	▼24.82
NCP	Kaptan Malik	18,144	14.51	New
MNS	Chandrakant Genu More	11,708	9.36	▼23.30
Independent	Ajay Badgujar	4,365	3.49	New
Independent	Adv. Vivian Gasper D Souza	2,108	1.69	New
NOTA	None of the Above	1,766	1.41	New
Margin of victory		1,297	1.04	▼9.99
Turnout		1,26,873	50.15	▲3.93
Total valid votes		1,25,079		
Registered electors		2,52,994		▼1.78
SS gain from INC		Swing	▼19.12	

=== Assembly Election 2009 ===
2009 Maharashtra Legislative Assembly election : Kalina
Party	Candidate	Votes	%	±%
INC	Kripashankar Singh	51,205	43.68	New
MNS	More Chandrakant Genu	38,284	32.66	New
BJP	Adv. Dinanath Tiwari	13,994	11.94	New
SP	Ashraf Azmi Aslam Azmi	10,977	9.36	New
BSP	More Shravan Yamaji	1,228	1.05	New
Margin of victory		12,921	11.02	
Turnout		1,17,228	45.51	
Total valid votes		1,17,227		
Registered electors		2,57,576		
INC win (new seat)				

== See also ==
- Kalina
- List of constituencies of Maharashtra Vidhan Sabha
