= Milind Anna Kamble =

Indian politician

Milind Anna Kamble is an Indian politician and member of the Nationalist Congress Party. Kamble won the Kurla (Vidhan Sabha constituency) in 2009 Maharashtra Legislative Assembly election.
