= Kalelkar Commission =

1953 commission of Kaka Kalelkar

Adhering to Article 340 of the Constitution of India, the First Backward Classes Commission was set up by a presidential order on 29 January 1953 under the chairmanship of Kaka Kalelkar. It is also known as the First Backward Classes Commission, 1955 or the Kaka Kalelkar Commission.

== Purposes ==
Its defined purposes were to:

1. Determine the criteria to be adopted in considering whether any sections of the people in the territory of India in addition to the SC and ST as socially and educationally backward classes, using such criteria it was to prepare a list of such classes setting out also their approximate members and their territorial distribution.
2. Investigate the conditions of all such socially and educationally backward classes and the differences under which they labour and make recommendations
  1. as to the steps that should be taken by the union or any state to remove such difficulties or to improve their economic condition, and
  2. as to the grants that should be made for the purpose by the union or any state and the conditions subject to which such grants should be made;
  3. Investigate such other matters as the president may hereafter refer to them and
  4. Present to the president a report setting out the facts as found by them and making such recommendations as they think proper.

== Criteria ==
For identifying socially and educationally backward classes, the commission adopted the following criteria:

1. Low social position in the traditional caste hierarchy of Hindu society.
2. Lack of general educational advancement among the major section of a caste or community.
3. Inadequate or no representation in government services.
4. Inadequate representation in the field of trade, commerce and industry

Following descriptions was used for classification of various communities as educationally and socially backward:

1. Those who suffer from the stigma of untouchability or near untouchability. (already classified as SC)
2. Those tribes are not yet sufficiently assimilated into the general social order. (already classified as ST)
3. Those who, owing to long neglect, have been driven as community to crime. (Ex-criminal or Denotified Groups)
4. Those nomads who do not enjoy any social respect and who have no appreciation of a fixed habitat and are given to mimicry, begging, jugglery, dancing, etc.
5. Communities consisting largely of agricultural and landless laborers.
6. Communities consisting largely of tenants without occupancy rights and those with insecure land tenure.
7. Communities consisting of a large percentage of small land owners with uneconomic holdings.
8. Communities engaged in cattle breeding, sheep breeding or fishing on a small scale.
9. Artisans and occupational classes without the security of employment and whose traditional occupations have ceased to be remunerative.
10. Communities, the majority of whose people do not have sufficient education and, therefore, have not secured adequate representation in government services.
11. Social groups among the Muslims, Christians and Sikhs who are still backward socially and educationally.
12. Communities occupying low position in social hierarchy.

== Recommendations ==
The commission submitted its report on 30 March 1955. It had prepared a list of 2,399 backward castes or communities for the entire country and of which 837 (* starred communities) had been classified as the ‘most backward’ Some of the most noteworthy recommendations of the commission were:

1. Undertaking caste-wise enumeration of the population in the census of 1961.
2. Relating social backwardness of a class to its low position in the traditional caste hierarchy of Hindu society,
3. Treating all women as a class as ‘backward’;
4. Reservation of 70 percent seats in all technical and professional institutions for qualified students of backward classes.
5. That special economic measures be taken to uplift the OBCs economically through such programmes as extensive land reforms, reorganization of the village economy, Bhoodan movement, development of livestock, dairy farming, cattle insurance, bee-keeping, piggery, fisheries, development of rural housing, public health and rural water supply, adult literacy programme, etc.; and
6. minimum reservation of vacancies in all government services and local bodies for other backward classes on the following scale: class I = 25 percent; class II = 33½ percent; class III and IV = 40 percent.

Kaka Kalelkar, the Chairman, took a rather equivocal stand on the issue, though he did not record formal minutes of dissent, in his forwarding letter to the President he opposed some recommendations made by the commission

== Observations in the Report ==
The commission’s observations:

1. The commission observed that although untouchability or tribal character may not be found, the backwardness persists, the tribal people found anywhere in the state should be brought under the list and a uniform policy must be followed throughout India in the interest of the advancement of these classes otherwise it will amount to setting a premium on their remaining within certain areas. It would be invidious to single out sections of the community or areas of modernization and to deprive people of help on that score. Let the whole community get modernized. The whole state should be one unit and the help offered to the tribal people must be given to them irrespective of their shifting from one area to another in the state.
2. The privileged classes must voluntarily renounce their privileges and their claims to social superiority and must work wholeheartedly for the eradication of social evils.
3. The ultimate solution seems to be that all production and distribution should be on a socialistic basis and that people should be encouraged to establish the necessary moral basis and to train themselves for the change over.
4. In India, economic backwardness is often the result and not the cause of social evils.
5. In the final analysis, I stand for a social order in which neither religion nor political power is organized to control the destinies of humanity. Just as we stand for a secular democracy, I stand for a non-political social order based on mutual love, trust, respect and service. But, this has nothing to do with the universal adult franchise which I accept whole-heartedly.
6. According to the terms of reference to the commission, we were asked to consider whether any sections of the people of the territory of India, in addition to the Scheduled Castes and the Scheduled Tribes, should be treated as socially and educationally backward classes. The word specifically used are classes and sections of the people and not castes; and yet, as explained in the body of the report the word ‘sections and classes’ can in the present context mean nothing but castes, and no other interpretation is feasible. It must be admitted, however, that, taking the wording of terms of reference, we are not precluded from interpreting the words ‘sections and classes of the people’ in their widest significance even excluding the idea of caste. We feel we were justified in accepting the traditional interpretation. We were warned by well-wishers of the country that investigations into caste may encourage people to be caste-conscious, and thus increase the atmosphere of communalism. Following the analogy if the proverb, viz. ‘using the thorn to remove a thorn’, we held that the evils of caste could be removed by measures which could be considered in terms of caste alone.
7. We have in our Report, given a list of backward classes and put a star (*) against those communities which are extremely backward and are leading a sub-human existence (e.g. The Class of Shepherd Community i.e. Dhangar / Hatkar / Hatgar / Gadri / Gadaria / Kurmar / Mirdha / Bharwad (Sr.No.27 Vol II, pg 66) (Their condition is far from satisfactory (Vol I pg. 76-77) (Found in Bombay, Hyderabad, Madhya Pradesh (Now Maharashtra, A.P., M.P. Gujarat). Those communities generally live in rural areas, and are mostly victims of the domination of the privileged and dominant communities. It should be irony and a mockery of justice to allow such dominant communities to claim to be the natural leaders of these starred communities who are the victims of their domination.
8. It can be safely said that those who possess large tracts of land; those who have enough money to lend, those who have brains to create quarrels and factions amongst the people, and those who have the tradition of wielding governmental power, are all dominant people in the rural areas. I did not succeed in the effort of classifying the backward classes because I could not carry conviction to my colleagues that these dominant communities must be segregated if the victims of domination have to be saved.
9. Who, then are the backward people? Evidently those who do not command adequate and sufficient representation in government service, those who do not command a large amount of natural resources like land, money and industrial undertakings; those who live in ill-ventilated houses; those who are nomadic; those who live by begging and other unwholesome means; those who are agricultural laborers or those who practice unremunerative occupations without any means to enter better-paying professions; and those who on account of poverty, ignorance and other social disabilities are unable to educate themselves or produce sufficient leadership, are all backward. The communities, classes or social groups who occupy an inferior social position in relation to the upper castes and who also answer the above description, naturally come under the category of other backward classes.
10. It is therefore, essential that no dominating community should be allowed to claim to be the protectors of the weaker sections. It is only the good men from every community, men who are imbued with a sense of social justice, who can forget caste prejudices, are prepared to surrender their privileges and who can combine to usher in a new era of social justice and universal familyhood, that can be natural leaders and protectors of the helpless, mute and suffering masses. It is much better if new communities are allowed to try their hands at leadership. Only those like Nehru, are above communal considerations and even nationalistic considerations, should be allowed, to formulate the policy of the nation. It is no use challenging the leadership of the best in the land by searching out the community to which they belong, and then accusing them that they are monopolizing leadership for the upper classes. All monopoly must be broken even of it is fully justified and opportunities for service must be assured to all sections of the population.
11. He has given the history of reservations and political leadership in India.

== Scheduled Caste and Scheduled Tribes ==
This commission also examined the existing list of Schedule Caste and Schedule Tribes and recommended certain additions to, and deletions from, these lists. These recommendations were duly examined in consultation with the State Governments, the Commissioner of the Schedule Tribes and the Deputy Registrar General, and the Government accepted these recommendations by passing The Scheduled Caste and Scheduled Tribes Orders (Amendment) Act, 1956. (Act LXIII of 1956).

== Implementation ==
This report was rejected by the Central government on the ground that it had not applied any objective tests for identifying the Backward Class. Thus there was a need of second backward classes Commission.

== See also ==
- Other Backward Class
