= Anant Shivaji Desai =

Indian businessman

- Born: 17 October 1853; Walawal, Sawantwadi, Bengal Presidency, British India
- Occupation: Businessman

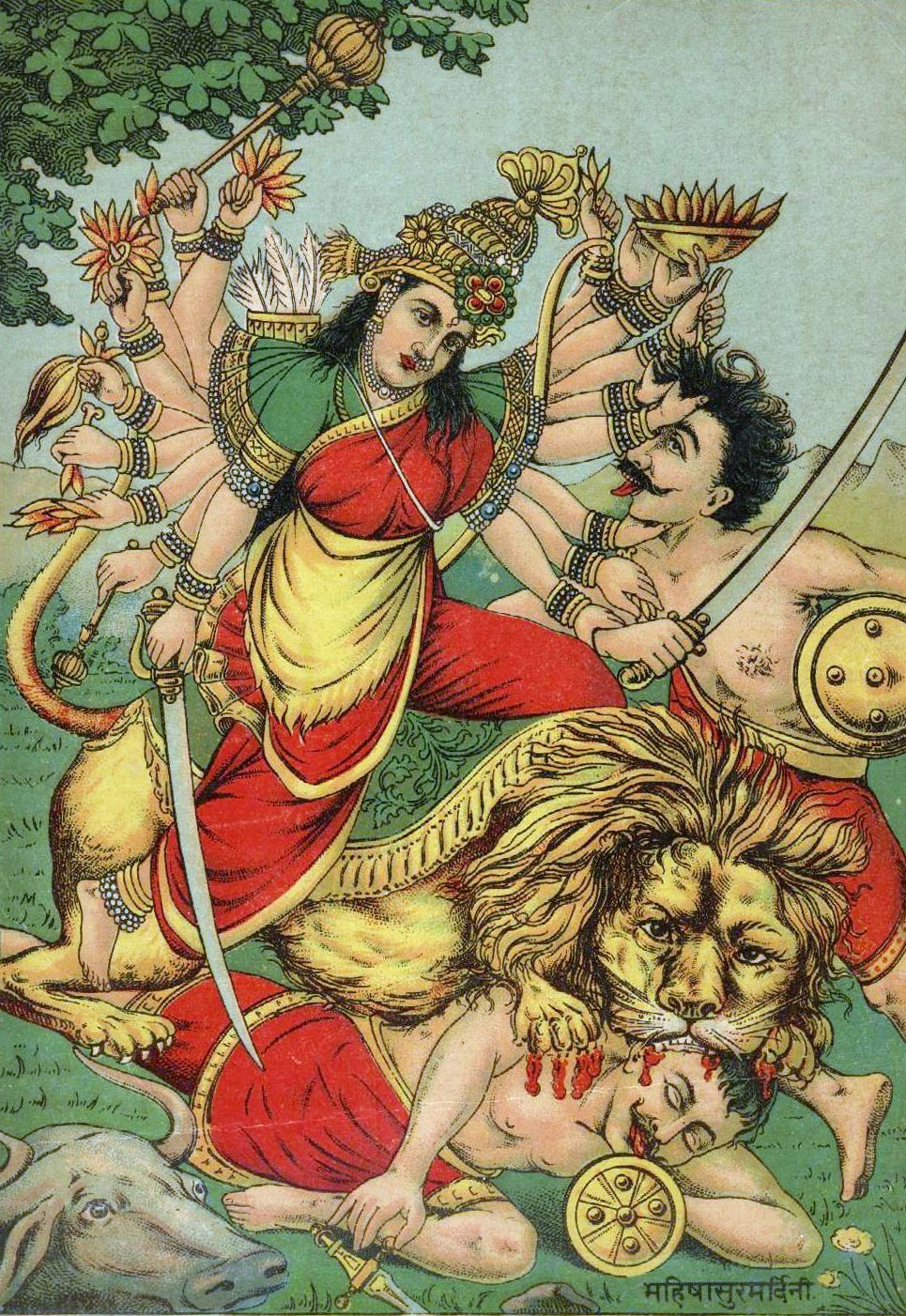
An example of prints by Anant Shivaji Desai

Anant Shivaji Desai (born 17 October 1853 in Walawal, nicknamed Bhausaheb Topiwalla) was an Indian businessman from the erstwhile Sawantwadi State in British India. He established himself as a publisher in Bombay, selling prints of Raja Ravi Verma's paintings. After Varma's death in 1906, Desai acquired the rights to the Baroda and Mysore collections, publishing them until 1945, when the original Ravi Varma Press firm went out of business.

Due to the poor financial conditions of his family, Desai could not proceed with his education after 3rd grade. He then came to Mumbai to work and earn money. Doing various physical works and trying his hand at many businesses, his business of manufacturing topis (headgears) took boom. Since then he got his nickname Topiwala.

Desai's social work included foundation of various schools. The Anant Shivaji Desai Topiwalla High School at Malvan, now called after his nickname as Topiwalla High School, was founded in 1911. Various roads, schools, college, libraries and other institutes are named after him. For his notable work towards the society, the then British Empire in India honoured him with the title of "Raobahadur".
