= Parag Alavani =

Indian politician

Parag Madhusudan Alavani

Member of the Maharashtra Legislative Assembly
- In office 2019–2024
- In office 2014–2019
- In office 2024–2029

Brihanmumbai Municipal Corporation (BMC) Corporator 1997- 2002 2002 - 2007

Personal details
- Born: 11 February 1967 (age 59)
- Party: Bharatiya Janata Party
- Spouse(s): Jyoti Alavani - BMC Corporator (2012 to 2017 and 2017 to 2022)
- Occupation: Politician
- Website: maharashtra.bjp.org

Parag Madhusudan Alavani (born 11 February 1967) is a sitting MLA from Vile Parle Assembly constituency, Mumbai, Maharashtra, representing Bharatiya Janata Party. His constituency is in the Mumbai Suburban district.

== Constituency ==
Parag Alavani was elected from the Vile Parle Assembly Constituency in Mumbai, to Maharashtra Vidhan Sabha in 2014 and 2019.

== Positions held ==
- Maharashtra Legislative Assembly MLA.
- Terms in office: 2014–2019.
- Terms in office: 2019–2024
- Terms in office: 2024 –

== Education ==
B.Sc. (Mathematics), LL.B.

== Career ==
Alavani served as Akhil Bhartiya Vidyarthi Parishad (ABVP) as College Pramukh (1986); Vibhag Secretary Paschim Mumbai (1987); Vibhag Pramukh Paschim Mumbai (1988) and Secretary ABVP Mumbai Unit (1989 and 1990). He held roles within the Bharatiya Janata Party (BJP), including serving as the Mumbai Secretary for Bharatiya Janata Yuva Morcha (1993) and President (1995).

Alavani was elected as a Municipal Councilor in 1997 and 2002, where he worked in municipal governance for a decade. During his tenure as a Municipal Councilor, he served as Chairman of the Ward Committee, overseeing developmental projects and initiatives in the community.

Alavani served within the Bharatiya Janata Party (BJP) as the Improvement Committee Chairman (2002 to 2003) and Group Leader of BJP (2003 to 2007) in the Brihanmumbai Municipal Corporation (BMC).

He won the Vile Parle Assembly seat in 2014 with a margin of 32,750 votes and securing 74,241 votes. In 2019 he won with a margin of 58,427 votes by securing 84,991 votes.

He worked as District General Secretary - erstwhile North West Mumbai (1997); District President (1998 to 2000 and 2000 to 2003); General Secretary Mumbai BJP (2006 to 2012 and BJP Mumbai Vice President (2015 till date). He served as the President of the Vile Parle Cultural Centre.
