= Sharad Dighe =

Indian politician

Member of Parliament, Lok Sabha
- In office 1984-89 ,1991-1996
- Constituency: Mumbai North Central

Speaker of the Maharashtra Legislative Assembly
- In office 1980-1984

Personal details
- Born: 10 October 1924 Bombay, British India
- Died: 18 April 2002 Mumbai, Maharashtra
- Party: Indian National Congress
- Spouse: Vasanti Sharad Dighe
- Children: 4

Sharad Shankar Dighe (1924–2002) was an Indian politician. He was elected to the Lok Sabha from the Bombay North Central as a member of the Indian National Congress. He was earlier the Speaker of the Maharashtra Legislative Assembly.
