= Mumbai North Central Lok Sabha constituency =

Lok Sabha Constituency in Maharashtra

Coordinates: 19.2°N 72.8°E

Mumbai North Central
- Lok Sabha constituency
- Interactive Map Outlining Mumbai North Central Lok Sabha Constituency

Constituency details
- Country: India
- Region: Western India
- State: Maharashtra
- Assembly constituencies: Vile Parle; Chandivali; Kurla; Kalina; Vandre East; Vandre West
- Established: 1952
- Total electors: 17,44,032 (2024)
- Reservation: None

Member of Parliament
- 18th Lok Sabha
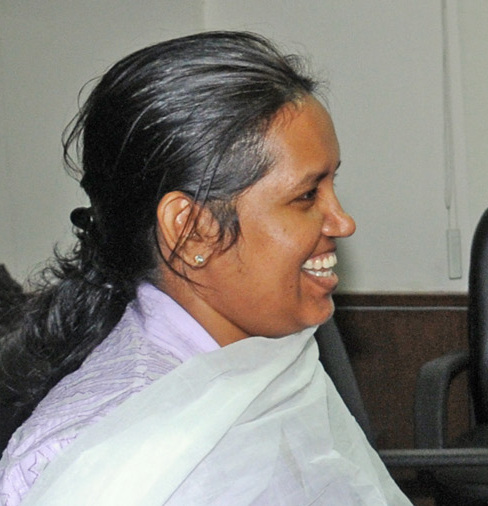
- Incumbent Varsha Gaikwad
- Party: INC
- Alliance: INDIA
- Elected year: 2024
- Preceded by: Poonam Mahajan

Mumbai North Central is a Lok Sabha (parliamentary) constituency of Maharashtra state in western India.

== Assembly segments ==
Presently, after the implementation of the delimitation of the parliamentary constituencies in 2008, Mumbai North Central Lok Sabha constituency comprises the following six Vidhan Sabha segments:

No	Name	District	Member	Party	Leading (in 2024)
167	Vile Parle	Mumbai Suburban	Parag Alavani	BJP	BJP
168	Chandivali	Mumbai Suburban	Dilip Lande	SHS	INC
174	Kurla (SC)	Mumbai Suburban	Mangesh Kudalkar	SHS	INC
175	Kalina	Mumbai Suburban	Sanjay Potnis	SS(UBT)	INC
176	Vandre East	Mumbai Suburban	Varun Sardesai	SS(UBT)	INC
177	Vandre West	Mumbai Suburban	Ashish Shelar	BJP	BJP

== Members of Parliament ==
Year	Member	Party
1952	Narayan Sadoba Kajrolkar	Indian National Congress
1957	Shripad Amrit Dange	Communist Party of India
1957	Gopal Kaluji Manay (Maane)	Scheduled Castes Federation
1962	Narayan Sadoba Kajrolkar	Indian National Congress
1967	Ramchandra Dhondiba Bhandare	Indian National Congress
1971	Ramchandra Dhondiba Bhandare	Indian National Congress
1973^	Roza Vidyadhar Deshpande	Communist Party of India
1977	Ahilya Rangnekar	Communist Party of India (Marxist)
1980	Pramila Dandavate	Janata Party
1984	Sharad Dighe	Indian National Congress
1989	Vidyadhar Gokhale	Shiv Sena
1991	Sharad Dighe	Indian National Congress
1996	Narayan Athawale	Shiv Sena
1998	Ramdas Athawale	Republican Party of India (Athawale)
1999	Manohar Joshi	Shiv Sena
2004	Eknath Gaikwad	Indian National Congress
2009	Priya Dutt	Indian National Congress
2014	Poonam Mahajan	Bharatiya Janata Party
2019	Poonam Mahajan	Bharatiya Janata Party
2024	Varsha Gaikwad	Indian National Congress

Note: ^ by-poll

== Election results ==
=== General elections, 2024 ===
2024 Indian general election: Mumbai North Central
Party	Candidate	Votes	%	±%
INC	Varsha Gaikwad	445,545	48.93	▲9.38
BJP	Ujjwal Nikam	4,29,031	47.12	▼6.85
NOTA	None of the Above	9749	1.07	▼0.11
Majority		16,514	1.81	▼12.61
Turnout		9,10,742	52.21	▼1.47
INC gain from BJP		Swing		

=== General elections, 2019 ===
2019 Indian general elections: Mumbai North Central
Party	Candidate	Votes	%	±%
BJP	Poonam Mahajan	486,672	53.97	−2.64
INC	Priya Sunil Dutt	3,56,667	39.55	+5.03
VBA	Abdur Rehman Anjaria	33,703	3.74	N/A
NOTA	None of the Above	10,669	1.18	+0.36
Majority		1,30,005	14.42	−7.67
Turnout		9,01,797	53.68	+5.02
BJP hold		Swing	-2.64	

=== General elections, 2014 ===
2014 Indian general elections: Mumbai North Central
Party	Candidate	Votes	%	±%
BJP	Poonam Mahajan	478,535	56.61	+34.82
INC	Priya Sunil Dutt	2,91,764	34.52	−13.53
AAP	Phiroze Palkhivala	34,824	4.12	N/A
BSP	Anandrao Vyankatrao Shinde	10,128	1.20	−5.33
SP	Abu Azmi	9,873	1.17	N/A
NOTA	None of the Above	6,937	0.82	N/A
Majority		1,86,771	22.09	−4.17
Turnout		8,45,292	48.66	+9.14
BJP gain from INC		Swing	+8.56	

=== General elections, 2009 ===
2009 Indian general elections: Mumbai North Central
Party	Candidate	Votes	%	±%
INC	Priya Sunil Dutt	319,352	48.05	−1.75
BJP	Mahesh Jethmalani	1,44,797	21.79	N/A
MNS	Shilpa Atul Sarpotdar	1,32,546	19.94	N/A
BSP	Ebrahim Shaikh	43,425	6.53	+5.12
RSPS	Surekha Pevekar	7,085	1.07	N/A
Majority		1,74,555	26.26	+23.67
Turnout		6,64,647	39.52	−7.91
INC hold		Swing	-1.75	

=== General elections, 2004 ===
2004 Indian general elections: Mumbai North Central
Party	Candidate	Votes	%	±%
INC	Eknath Mahadeo Gaikwad	256,282	49.80	
SS	Manohar Gajanan Joshi	2,42,953	47.21	−8.62
BSP	Jaswar Satyaram Ballikaran	7,292	1.41	
NCP	Shaikh Samad Abdul Salam	3,475	0.68	
NLP	Khan Akram Ali	2,404	0.47	
Independent	Khan Mohammad Rasheed	1,117	0.22	
Independent	Khan Mohammad Meraz	1,070	0.21	
Majority		13,329	2.59	
Turnout		5,14,600	46.05	+0.04
INC gain from SS		Swing		

=== General elections, 1999 ===
1999 Indian general election: Mumbai North Central
Party	Candidate	Votes	%	±%
SS	Manohar Joshi	294,935	55.82	+10.14
BBM	Raja Dhale	1,25,940	23.84	
Independent	B.C. Kamble	56,684	10.73	
Majority		1,68,995	31.98	
Turnout		5,28,342	46.01	
SS gain from RPI		Swing		

=== General elections, 1998 ===
1998 Indian general election: Mumbai North Central
Party	Candidate	Votes	%	±%
RPI	Ramdas Athawale	282,373	50.18	+31.46
SS	Narayan Athawale	2,57,141	45.69	−2.23
BSP	Jaiswal Ramprasad	8,295	1.47	
Majority		25,232	4.48	
Turnout		562,740		
RPI gain from SS		Swing	+16.84	

=== General elections, 1996 ===
1996 Indian general election: Mumbai North Central
Party	Candidate	Votes	%	±%
SS	Narayan Athawale	242,536	47.92	+9.03
INC	Sharad Dighe	153,337	30.30	−13.01
RPI	Bapu Chandrasen Kamble	94,729	18.72	
Majority		89,199	17.62	+14.22
Turnout		506,146		
SS gain from INC		Swing	+10.52	

=== General elections, 1991 ===
1991 Indian general election: Bombay North Central
Party	Candidate	Votes	%	±%
INC	Sharad Dighe	180,084	43.31	−0.6
SS	Vidyadhar Gokhale	165,872	39.89	−1.6
JD	Ruston Tirandaz	58,988	14.19	
JP	Gopal Dukhande	3,110	0.75	
BSP	Tanaji Hirve	1,680	0.40	
Majority		14,212	3.4	+2
Turnout		415,777		
INC gain from SS		Swing	-1.1	

=== General elections, 1989 ===
1989 Indian general election: Bombay North Central
Party	Candidate	Votes	%	±%
SS	Vidyadhar Gokhale	254,841	44.91	
INC	Sharad Dighe	246,656	43.47	
BRP	Panchdeo Jaiswal	35,636	6.28	
Independent	Rustam Tirandaz	21,599	3.81	
Majority		8,185		
Turnout		567,431		
SS gain from INC		Swing		

=== General elections, 1984 ===
1984 Indian general election: Bombay North Central
Party	Candidate	Votes	%	±%
INC	Sharad Dighe	211,443	48.44	+5.87**
BJP	Manohar Joshi	79,345	18.18	N/A
JP	Pramila Dandavate	74,401	17.04	−28.21
Independent	Dada Samant	58,693	13.45	
LKD	Bipin Mamu Sanghar	4,972	1.14	
Majority		132,098	30.26	
Turnout		436,526	56.24	
INC gain from JP		Swing		

=== General elections, 1980 ===
1980 Indian general election: Bombay North Central
Party	Candidate	Votes	%	±%
JP	Pramila Madhu Dandavate	1,86,355	45.25	N/A
INC(I)	Vasantrao Hoshing	1,76,544	42.87	N/A
CPI(M)	Ahilya Rangnekar	42,209	10.25	−47.46
Majority		9,811	2.38	−15.31
Turnout		4,11,833	54.35	−4.89
JP gain from CPI(M)		Swing		

=== General elections, 1977 ===
1977 Indian general election: Bombay North Central
Party	Candidate	Votes	%	±%
CPI(M)	Ahilya Rangnekar	2,28,123	57.71	
INC	R. D. Bhandare	1,58,208	40.02	
Majority		69,915	17.69	
Turnout		3,95,292	59.24	
CPI(M) gain from CPI		Swing		

=== General elections, 1952 ===
1952 Indian general election: Bombay City North
Party	Candidate	Votes	%	±%
INC	GANDHI VITHAL BALKRISHNA	1,49,138	20.83	Winner −1
Socialist	MEHTA ASHOK RANJITRAM	1,39,741	19.52	Winner −2
INC	Narayan Kajrolkar	1,38,137	19.30	
SCF	Dr Ambedkar	1,23,576	17.26	
Majority				

=== General elections, 1952 ===
Two candidates were elected from some seats in 1952 elections.
One MP was : Vitthal Gandhi, Congress (149,138 votes) defeated the socialist leader Ashok Mehta (139,741)
Second MP : Narayan Kajrolkar, Congress (138,137 votes) defeated Dr Ambedkar (123,576)

== See also ==
- Mumbai
- List of constituencies of the Lok Sabha
