= Avtar Singh Malhotra =

Indian politician

Avtar Singh Malhotra ਅਵਤਾਰ ਸਿੰਘ ਮਲਹੋਤਰਾ
- Born: 18 April 1917; Rawalpindi, Punjab, British Raj (now Pakistan)
- Died: 23 May 2005 (aged 88); Chandigarh, Punjab, India
- Occupation: Politician

Avtar Singh Malhotra (Punjabi: ਅਵਤਾਰ ਸਿੰਘ ਮਲਹੋਤਰਾ; 18 April 1917 – 23 May 2005) was a Punjabi politician belonging to the Communist Party of India from Punjab, India. He is famous for his active leadership to communist and patriotic resistance in 1980's during separatist insurgency in Punjab.

== Biography ==
Born on 18 April 1917, at Daultala town, in Rawalpindi District, British Punjab (now in Pakistan), Mr Malhotra spent his childhood there.

After passing the MA (English) in first division in the 1940s, Mr Malhotra became a lecturer of English in a college at Rawalpindi. He joined communist movement during this period. He quit his job in 1945 and became the editor of the communist party publication weekly Jange Azadi.

== Books ==
- The Punjab Crisis and the Way Out (Communist Party Publication, 1984)
- Save Punjab, Save India (Communist Party Publication, 1984)
- Punjab Problem and Solution (Communist Party Publication, 1985)
- What is the Communist Party? (Communist Party Publication, 1986)
- Punjab: Martyrs of CPI : they gave their lives for communal amity and national integrity (Communist Party Publication, 1988)
- For Indian Unity Democratise Centre-state Relations (Communist Party Publication, 1991)
- Role of Communists in the Struggle for Linguistic States (Communist Party Publication, 1986)
- The Nature of the Bahujan Samaj Party (C. Rajeswara Rao, Avtar Singh Malhotra

New Age Printing Press, 1988)

- History of Sirsa Town
