= Sanjay Potnis =

Indian politician

Member of the Maharashtra Legislative Assembly
- Incumbent
- Assumed office 2014
- Preceded by: Kripashankar Singh
- Constituency: Kalina

Personal details
- Party: Shiv Sena (Uddhav Balasaheb Thackeray); Shiv Sena

Sanjay Potnis is a Shiv Sena politician from Mumbai, Maharashtra. He is current member of the Maharashtra Legislative Assembly from Kalina Assembly constituency as a member of Shiv Sena.

== Positions held ==
- 2007: Elected as corporator in Brihanmumbai Municipal Corporation
- 2007–08: Chairman of Brihanmumbai Electric Supply and Transport (BEST)
- 2010–11: Chairman of Brihanmumbai Electric Supply and Transport (BEST)
- 2014: Elected to Maharashtra Legislative Assembly
- 2019: Re-Elected to Maharashtra Legislative Assembly
