= Ahilya Rangnekar =

Indian politician (1922–2009)

Member of Indian Parliament, Lok Sabha
- In office 1977–1980
- Constituency: Mumbai North Central

Personal details
- Born: 8 July 1922 Poona, Bombay Province, British India
- Died: 19 April 2009 (aged 86) Matunga, Mumbai, Maharashtra, India
- Party: Communist Party of India (Marxist)
- Spouse: P.B. Rangnekar
- Children: 2
- Relatives: B. T. Ranadive (brother)

Ahilya Rangnekar (8 July 1922 – 19 April 2009) was an Indian politician, a leader of the Communist Party of India (Marxist), and, from 1977 to 1980, the Mumbai North Central representative in the Lok Sabha parliament.

== Early life ==
Rangnekar was born in Pune. She was the youngest among eight children. Communist Party leader B.T. Ranadive was her elder brother.

== Political career ==
Ahilya Rangnekar joined the Communist Party of India in 1943. She participated in the Samyukta Maharashtra movement. She was one of the founders of "Parel Mahila Sangh" in 1943, which later became "Janwadi Mahila Sangh", the Maharashtra state unit of the All India Democratic Women's Association. Rangnekar later became the national working president of the AIDWA and in 2001, she became its patron. She was elected corporator of the Bombay Municipal Corporation for 19 years from 1961. She was the secretary of the Maharashtra state unit of the CPI (M) from 1983 to 1986. She was the member of its central committee from 1978 to 2005. In 1975, she was elected to the general council of the Centre of Indian Trade Unions and in 1979, she became its vice president.

== Personal life ==
Ahilya married P.B. Rangnekar in 1945. They had two sons, Ajit and Abhay.
