= Babhalgaon =

Village in Maharashtra, India

- Village
- Location in Maharashtra, India Babhalgaon (India) Babhalgaon (Asia)
- Coordinates: 18.24°N 76.82°E
- Country: India
- State: Maharashtra
- Region: Marathwada
- District: Latur

Government
  - Type: Gram Panchayat
  - Body: Gram Panchayat Babhalgaon
  - MLA: Amit Vilasrao Deshmukh
  - MP: Shivaji Kalge
- Elevation: 515 m (1,690 ft)

Population (2011)
  - Total: 7,353
- Demonym: Babhalgaonkar

Languages
  - Official: Marathi
- Time zone: UTC+5:30 (IST)
- PIN: 413531
- Telephone code: 02382
- Vehicle registration: MH-24

Babhalgaon is a village in Latur district in the Indian state of Maharashtra.

== Demographics ==
Population data(2011)
| Indicator | total | male | female |
|---|---|---|---|
| Total number of houses | 1,449 | | |
| Population | 7,353 | 3,892(52.93%) | 3,461(47.07% |
| Child(0 to 6) | 884(12.02%) | 482(54.52%) | 402(45.48%) |
| Scheduled caste | 1,726 | 901 | 825 |
| Scheduled tribe | 504 | 272 | 232 |
| Literacy rate | 74.73 | 81.88 | 66.75 |
| Total workers | 2,908 | 2,058 | 850 |
| Main workers | 2872 | | |
| Marginal workers | 36 | 19 | 17 |
| Cultivators | 441 | | |
| Agricultural labourers | 1,389 | | |

== Notable people ==
- Amit Vilasrao Deshmukh - MLA
- Dhiraj Vilasrao Deshmukh - MLA
- Diliprao Deshmukh - Former state minister of sports & youth welfare
- Riteish Vilasrao Deshmukh - Actor
- Vilasrao Deshmukh - Former chief minister of Maharashtra
