= Aftermath of the 2008 Mumbai attacks =

Effects and subsequent events of the Mumbai terrorist attacks in 2008

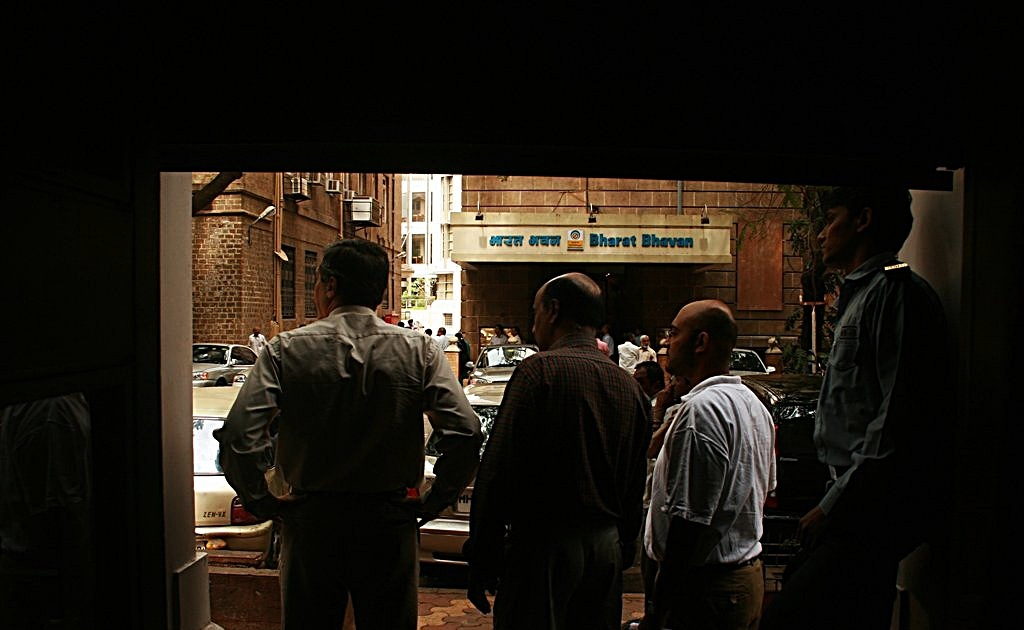
Office-workers at Ballard Estate reacting to rumours of shooting at Victoria Terminus, three minutes away from the Estate

In the aftermath of the 2008 Mumbai attacks, there were multiple and far-ranging events that were observed. Besides the immediate impact on the victims and their families, the attacks caused widespread anger among the Indian public, and condemnations from countries throughout the world.

The immediate impact was felt on Mumbai and Maharashtra state, and throughout urban India. There were also after-effects on the Indian government, centre-state relations within India, Indo-Pakistani relations, domestic impact within Pakistan, the United States's relationships with both countries, the US-led NATO war in Afghanistan, and on the global war on terror. There was also impact on the region of Kashmir and this also led to the 2010 Kashmir Unrest.

== Immediate impact ==
=== Impact on the attack locations ===
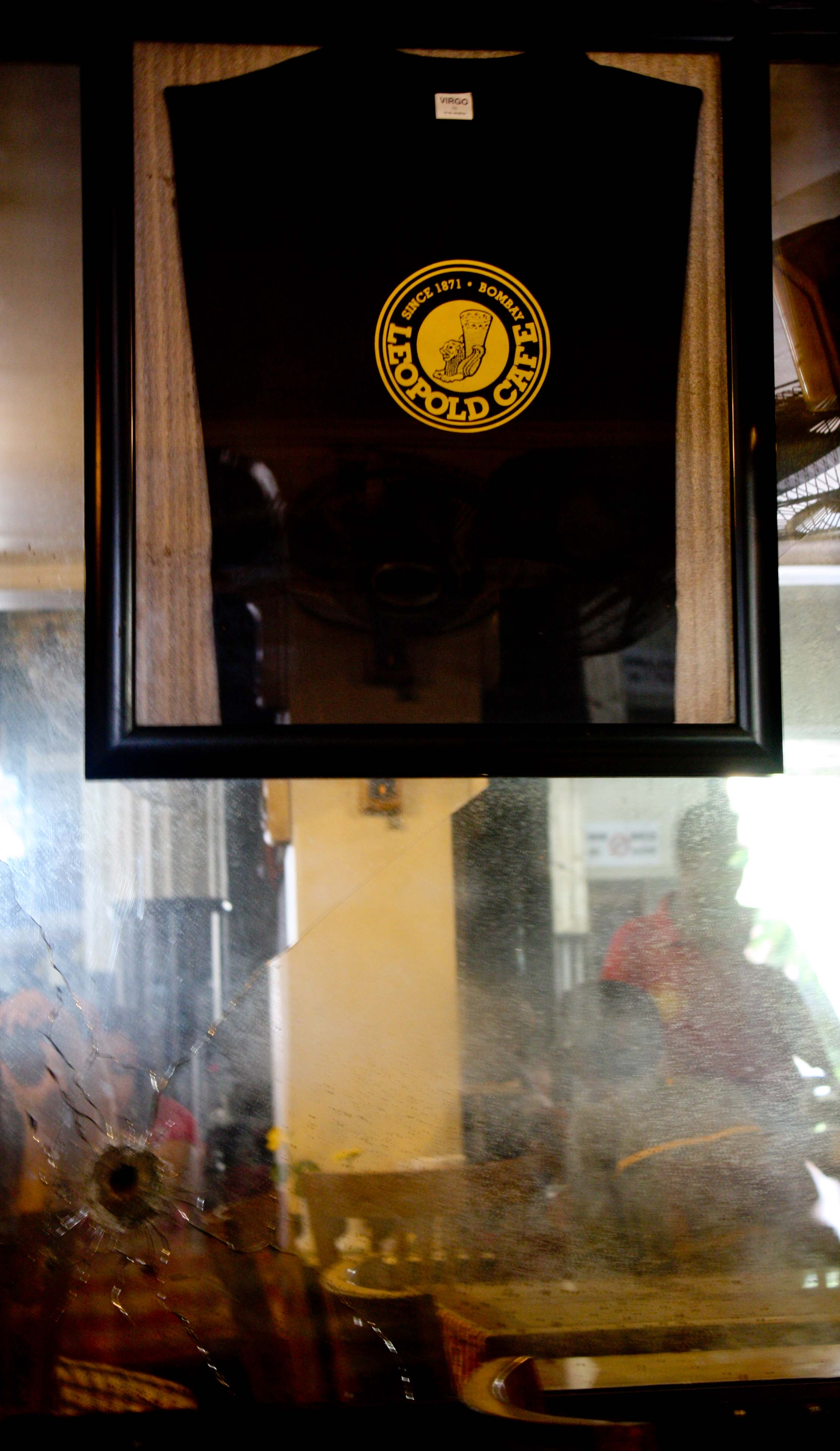
Bullet marks left at Cafe Leopold

The Leopold Cafe opened its doors to customers just four days after the attacks. The owners wanted to repair the damaged parts of the cafe, while retaining some of the damaged pieces as a tribute to those who lost their lives in the attacks.

Security forces handed back control of the Taj Mahal Hotel to the Taj group on 1 December 2008, and work on its repairs began that same day. Celebrated artist M.F. Hussain, whose art was destroyed in the attacks, agreed to replace the paintings with a series that condemned the attack. Hussain planned this series as a tribute to the staff of the hotel, who laid down their lives to save other people.

Control of the Trident was handed back to the management after the last attacker was killed, while the Oberoi took 3–4 months to resume operations. Both the Taj and Trident hotels reopened on 21 December 2008.

Nariman House also reopened right after the attack, but it is not known exactly when. Several young Chabad couples from all over the world stepped forward to move to Mumbai and continue the movement's work in the aftermath.

=== Impact on Mumbai ===
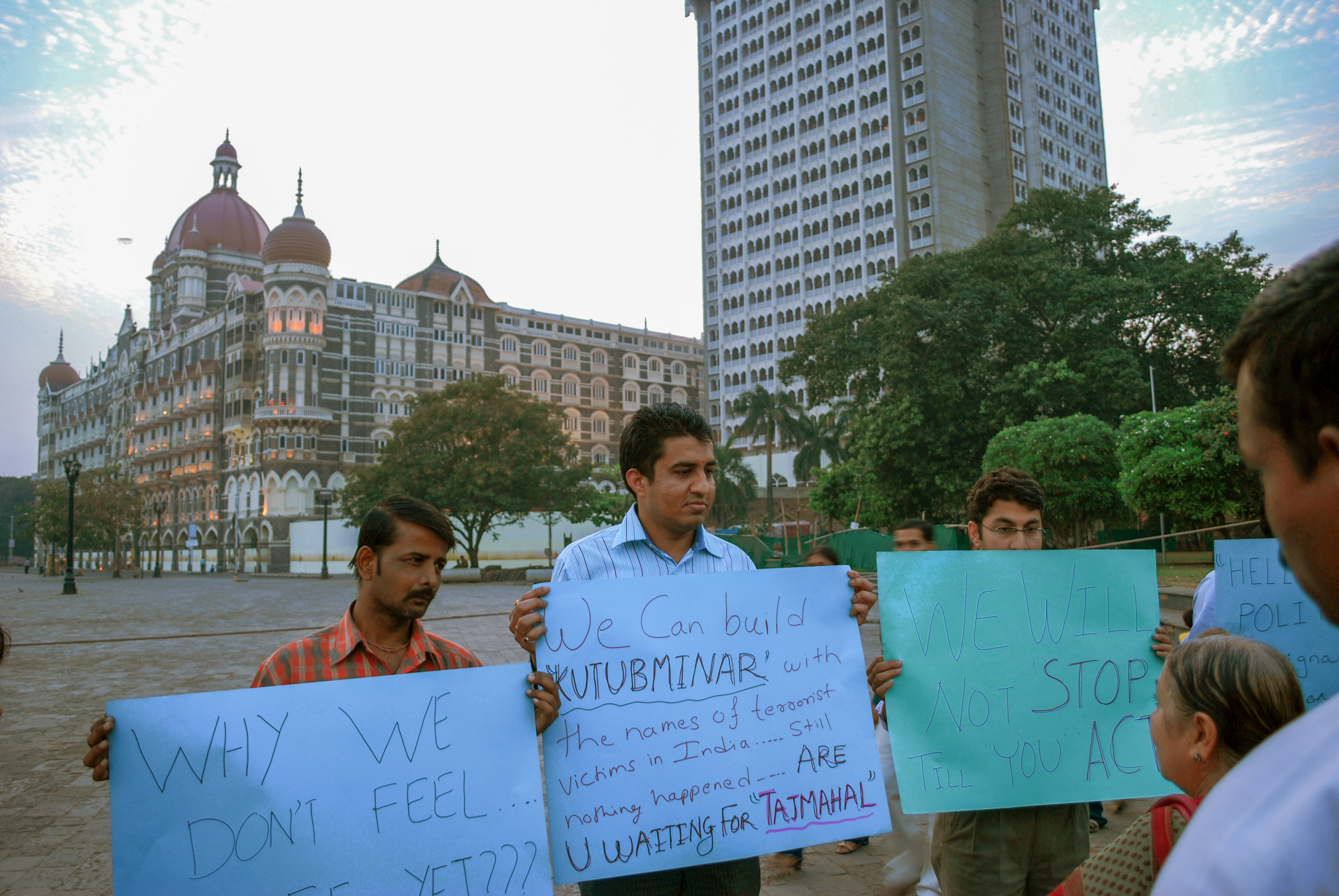
Citizens outside the Taj Mahal Palace demanding government action

In the aftermath of the 2008 Mumbai attacks, all schools and colleges, and most offices were closed. The Bombay Stock Exchange and National Stock Exchange remained closed on 27 November 2008. Shooting of Bollywood films and TV series had also been halted in the city. Many international airlines temporarily discontinued operations to Mumbai, in the interest of passenger and crew safety.

The release of the Hindi film Rab Ne Bana Di Jodi, was postponed in the aftermath of the attack and promotions were cancelled. During the preview, Shah Rukh Khan wept and condemned the attack, saying that he has no sympathy for those whose beliefs turn them to violence, and described the terrorists as "trying to snatch away what normal people do." He also stated that in the aftermath, people need a reason to smile while moving on with their lives.

The Indian Cricket League's ongoing tournament in Ahmedabad was canceled. The two remaining One Day Internationals of the seven match series between the visiting England cricket team and India were cancelled. The visiting team flew home, but returned to continue the test series. However, the venue of the second India-England test match, scheduled on 19–23 December, was shifted from Mumbai to Chennai. The inaugural Twenty20 Champions League, scheduled from 3 to 10 December, Mumbai being one of the host cities, was postponed. The attacks have brought into significance the issue of 379 Indian boats and 336 fishermen apprehended by the Pakistan marine agency, for entering their waters. Nearly 200 of the boats have reportedly been auctioned, now recognised as a national security issue for India. On 28 November, Pakistan released 99 fishermen who were apprehended, as part of confidence building measures with India. There were threats to blow up ITC Fortune Hotel in Navi Mumbai, after Mumbai police received a bomb threat from terrorists. Rumours about further shootings at Chhatrapati Shivaji Terminus were doing the rounds in Mumbai on 28 November, and were widely reported by the news channels. The Railway Police denied these rumours, but stopped trains approaching CST.

=== Maharashtra state government ===
Maharashtra's Chief Minister, Vilasrao Deshmukh, faced public backlash after he toured the terrorist-ravaged Taj Hotel with his actor son, Riteish Deshmukh, and film director Ram Gopal Varma. Reports suggested that Varma intended to make a film on the 26/11 attacks featuring Riteish Deshmukh, which prompted his visit to the site. This act was widely perceived as insensitive and disrespectful, leading to significant criticism of both the Chief Minister and his son. The public backlash ultimately forced Vilasrao Deshmukh to resign as Chief Minister, a position he never held again.

Deputy Chief Minister and Home Minister R. R. Patil also faced criticism for his response during a press conference, where he downplayed the severity of the attacks by quoting a dialogue from the 1995 Bollywood film Dilwale Dulhania Le Jayenge: "Bade bade shehron mein aisi choti choti baatein hoti rehti hain" ("Small things do happen in big cities"). He added, "They wanted to kill 5,000 people; we have minimized the damage." His remarks, coupled with his mishandling of the situation, provoked political backlash, leading to his resignation on December 1, 2008. Union Home Minister Shivraj Patil also stepped down in the wake of the attacks.

After seeing the disparity between the quality of helmets and bulletproof vests used by NSG commandos and the police, the Police Commissioner of Pune, Satyapal Singh, said his police officers needed the same quality equipment as used by the NSG to reduce deaths and improve performance.

As a result, Maharashtra government planned to buy 36 speed boats to patrol the coastal areas, and several helicopters for the same purpose. It also created an Anti-Terror force known as the Force One, and upgrade all the weapons that Mumbai Police they previously had.

The CST railway station was upgraded with metal detectors, but reports stated that these are ineffective because the attendants cannot hear their beeps in the crowd. Civilians have tested these using their own licensed weapons.

Maharashtra's new Home Minister, Jayant Patil, was forced to defend the performance of the police in the legislative assembly, against demands from the opposition parties for resignations from the police chief and other officials.

In an attempt to take forward the 26/11 probe, the Mumbai Police sent a three members team to the United States in this regard, sources said. The team comprising Inspector Bharti, Inspector Kadam and Inspector Arun Chavan shared the findings of the attacks, with the FBI. Mumbai police sent a proposal to the Home Ministry, stating the need to establish direct contact with the FBI, to facilitate investigation in the terror attacks. It was believed that the team, if permitted to go, will share the evidence gathered by Mumbai police, which prove Pakistan's hand in the attacks on the nation's integrity.

== After-effects ==
=== Government of India ===
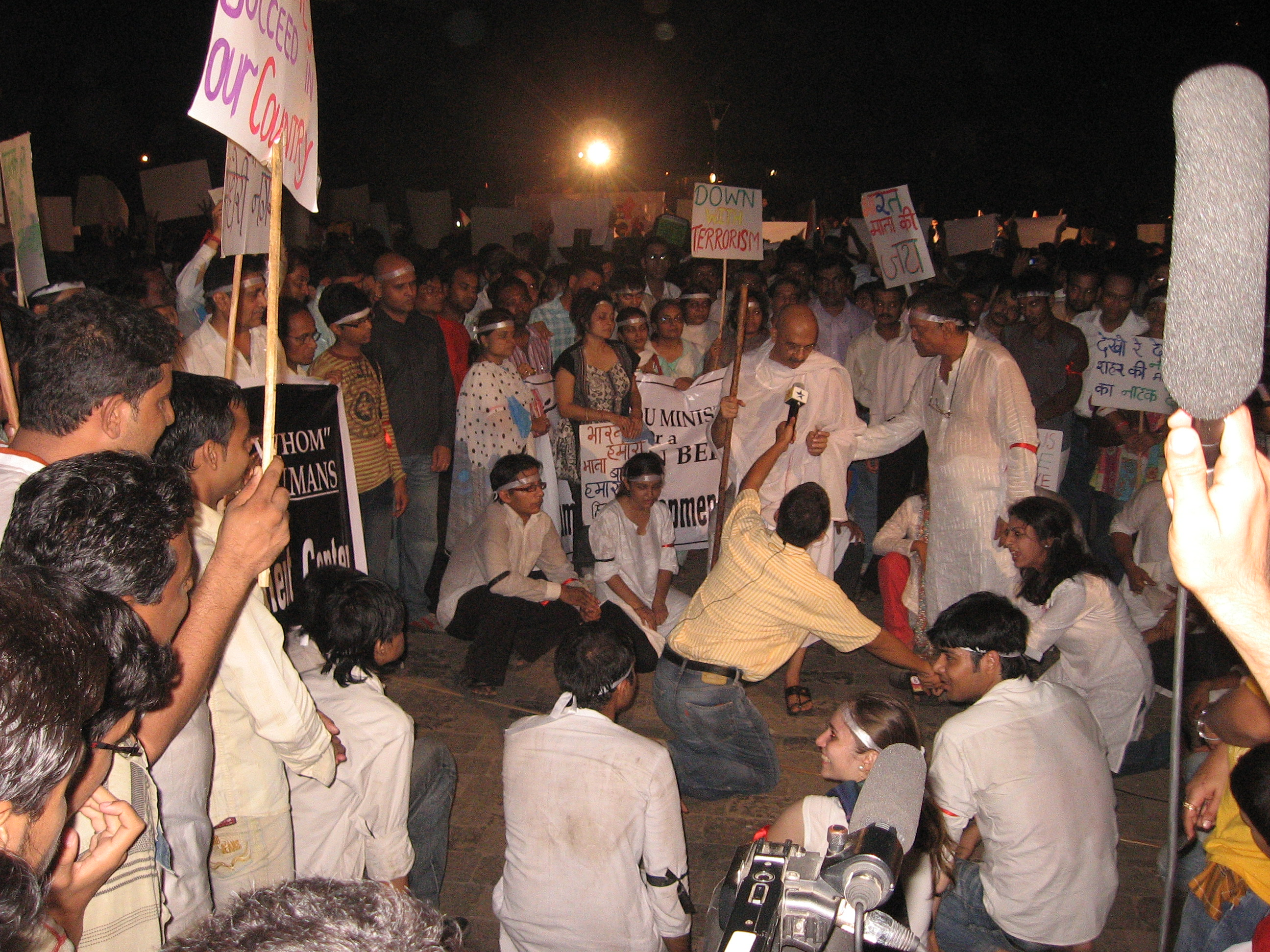
Protests against the Government were witnessed all across the Country

A Cabinet Committee on Security meeting was held on Tuesday, 2 December, to discuss expanding the National Security Guards (NSG) to cities outside Delhi. The aim is to have permanent presence of NSG anti-terrorist squads in cities such as Mumbai, Chennai, Bangalore, Hyderabad and Kolkata, to avoid wasting precious time travelling from Delhi.

Following the attack, it was decided that all NSG commandos undergo a new module of training, to learn how to deal with future anti-siege operations, because the Taj terrorists were in a gun battle for 59 hours continuously.

Prime Minister Dr. Manmohan Singh, on an all party conference, declared that legal framework will be strengthened in the battle against terrorism and a federal anti-terrorist intelligence and investigation agency, like the FBI, would be set up to co-ordinate actions against terrorism. On 17 December, the Lok Sabha approved two new anti-terror bills, which are expected to pass the upper house (Rajya Sabha) on the 19th. One sets up a National Investigation Agency, similar to the FBI, with sweeping powers of investigation. The second strengthens existing anti-terror laws, to allow suspects to be detained without bail for up to six months, on the orders of a judge.

==== Impact on sports ====
The terrorist group behind the attacks planned a similar attack in 2010, to take place at the 19th Commonwealth Games held in New Delhi. The attack however, was thwarted.

===== Cricket =====
After the attacks, as well as the 2009 attack on the Sri Lanka national cricket team, the Board of Control for Cricket in India (BCCI) prohibited Pakistani players from taking part in Indian Premier League. Since then, no Pakistani player played in IPL, except for the inaugural season. In addition, India refused to play any bilateral series with Pakistan, the last being in 2007, and pulled from the 2009 series, prompting the Pakistan Cricket Board to request the Sri Lankan team to join as a replacement.

Pakistan and India agreed to however, participate in Asia Cup and ICC events, the last T20 match to be held in New York June 9, 2024. The last ODI match was during the 2025 ICC Champions Trophy, in which India defeated Pakistan. However, instability rose following the 2025 Pahalgam attack, which was also perpetrated by Lashkar-e-Taiba, that led to India initially planning on boycotting matches against Pakistan in the 2025 Asia Cup. While the Group and Super 4 matches between India and Pakistan went ahead, tensions arose when Team India captain Suryakumar Yadav avoided shaking hands during toss and after winning the matches against Pakistan, and the ICC fined him 30% match fee for making political remarks by dedicating the victory to the Indian Army and the Pahalgam attack victims. Additional tensions arose due to insensitive gestures of Pakistan players Haris Rauf and Sahibzada Farhan, which led to backlash from Indian fans, with Rauf being fined 30% of his match fee while Farhan was given a warning.

==== Medical preparedness ====
A study of various incidents in Mumbai resulted in a proposal in 2020 to form a central medical control committee to oversee the medical response at sites of terrorist attack or in disaster zones. The report acknowledged that bystander support is crucial to the success of the model.

=== Centre-State relations ===
The National Investigation Agency Bill, 2008, set up a central agency for investigating terrorism related crimes. However, law and order is a state subject in the Constitution of India, which had made such a law difficult to pass in the past.

Union Home Minister P. Chidambaram assured parliament that the National Investigation Agency (NIA) did not usurp the States' right in any manner. The central government would make use of its power only under "extraordinary" circumstances, and depending on the gravity of the situation, he said. "The agency will also have the powers to return the investigations to the State, if it so thinks. We have struck a balance between the right of the States and duties of the Centre to investigate."

=== Indo-Pakistani relations ===
The attacks caused severe damage to India's already strained relationship with Pakistan. India handed over two demarches to Pakistan—one was submitted at the Foreign Office in Islamabad by Indian High Commissioner Satyabrata Pal. The Indian Ministry of External Affairs also summoned Pakistan High Commissioner Shahid Malik on 1 December 2008, to lodge a formal protest over Pakistan's failure to curb terrorism emanating from its soil. According to the Indian External Affairs Minister, Pranab Mukherjee, India, in the demarches to Pakistan, asked for the arrest and handover of those 20 persons, including gangster Dawood Ibrahim, the founder of Jaish-e-Mohammad, terrorist leader Maulana Masood Azhar and Lashkar-e-Taiba, and chief Hafiz Muhammad Saeed, who are settled in Pakistan and who are fugitives of Indian law. The external affairs minister had also stated that India will await Pakistan's response. He has not ruled out the option of military strikes against terrorist camps in Pakistan.

On 28 November, a hoax caller pretending to be the Indian Foreign Minister threatened Pakistan President Zardari with war, leading to the Pakistan military being put on high alert. Military aircraft with live ammunition were scrambled to patrol above Islamabad and Rawalpindi.

==== Requests for Pakistan's cooperation ====
India's claims that the perpetrators were Pakistan-based were consistently denied by Pakistan. Pakistan initially contested this attribution, but agreed this was the case on 7 January 2009. The Indian government supplied a dossier to Pakistan's high commission in Delhi, containing interrogations, weapons, and call records of conversations during the attacks. Shown to friendly governments and media, it provides a detailed sequence of training, supplying, and constant communications with handlers from Pakistan. The Pakistan government dismissed the dossier as "not evidence", but also announced that it had detained over a hundred members of Jamaat-ud-Dawa, a charity linked with Lashkar-e-Taiba. Moreover, Indian government officials said that the attacks were so sophisticated that they must have had official backing from Pakistani "agencies". an accusation denied by Pakistan.

At the request of Indian Prime Minister Manmohan Singh, the head of Pakistan's Inter-Services Intelligence (ISI), Ahmad Shuja Pasha, was reported to be coming to India to share intelligence and help the investigation, but later on it was decided by Pakistani authorities that instead of Director General of the ISI, his representative will visit India to help the Indian government in the investigations.

India handed over two demarches to Pakistan – one was submitted at the Foreign Office in Islamabad by Indian High Commissioner Satyabrata Pal. The Indian Ministry of External Affairs also summoned Pakistan High Commissioner Shahid Malik on 1 December 2008, to lodge a formal protest against Pakistan's inaction against terrorist groups operating within the country.

The Indian foreign ministry released a statement, describing the actions it expected Islamabad to take. "It was conveyed to the Pakistan high commissioner that Pakistan's actions needed to match the sentiments expressed by its leadership, that it wishes to have a qualitatively new relationship with India," the statement said. "He was informed that the recent terrorist attack on Mumbai was carried out by elements from Pakistan. Government expects that strong action would be taken against those elements, whosoever they may be, responsible for this outrage," it said.

The CNN-IBN reported that India had asked Pakistan to hand over Mumbai Underworld Don Dawood Ibrahim, Lashkar-e-Toiba chief Hafiz Muhammad Saeed and Jaish-e-Mohammed leader Maulana Masood Azhar for their suspected involvement in the Mumbai terror attack.

Dawood, India's most wanted criminal, was suspected to have helped the LeT terrorists who attacked Mumbai on 26 November. Azhar, founder of the terrorist group Jaish-e-Mohammad, is on India's most wanted list of people it accuses of terrorism. India freed Azhar from prison in exchange for passengers on a hijacked Indian Airlines Flight 814 in 1999.

Times of India, quoting Indian External Affairs Minister Pranab Mukherjee, reported: "Now, we have in our demarche asked (for) the arrest and handover of those persons who are settled in Pakistan and who are fugitives of Indian law"

"...there are lists of about 20 persons. (These) lists are sometimes altered and this exercise is going on and we have renewed it in our demarche", Mukherjee said, adding that India "will await" Pakistan's response in the Indian-Arab forum.

In an interview with NDTV, Pranab Mukherjee had not ruled out the option of military strikes against terror camps in Pakistan. Mukherjee said that every country has the right to protect its territorial integrity, and take appropriate action when necessary. He also said that it has become difficult to continue the peace process with Pakistan in this.

==== Denials from Pakistan ====
Ajmal Kasab, the lone terrorist arrested for the Mumbai attacks, had been identified by his father. The Pakistan High Commissioner to India, Shahid Malik, stated that this was insufficient; that they required evidence which would survive scrutiny in a court of law to confirm Ajmal's nationality.

The Mumbai police had said that Kasab had written a letter to the Pakistan High Commission in India, asking for help, and that the letter had been given to India's central government. In an interview with Karan Thapar aired on CNBC TV18, Malik denied its existence.

In January 2009, Pakistan's National Security Advisor Mahmud Ali Durrani admitted that Kasab was Pakistani citizen while speaking to the CNN-IBN news channel. The Government of Pakistan eventually acknowledged that Ajmal Kasab was indeed a Pakistani citizen, but also announced that Prime Minister Yousaf Raza Gilani had fired Durrani for "failing to take Gilani and other stakeholders into confidence" before making this information public, and for "a lack of coordination on matters of national security."

==== Interpol involvement ====
Shortly after the Mumbai attacks, the Interpol team visited India and "promised help in securing the details of the 10 gunmen who attacked several places in Mumbai, 26 November, leaving at least 173 people dead and more than 300 others injured".

Interpol Secretary General Ronald Noble arrived in Islamabad on Tuesday, 23 December, for talks over Indian allegations of involvement with Pakistan-based militant groups in the Mumbai terror attacks. Interpol secretary general Ronald Noble met Pakistan's security officials the same day.

However, in a later press-conference, the Interpol chief said that India didn't share any specific information with the Interpol regarding the terror attacks. He said that Interpol had the same information that had been with media and the general public. Pakistan's Minister for Information and Broadcasting Sherry Rehman claimed that this statement somehow supported Pakistan government's stance that Indian government has yet to share substantial and credible evidence with them, and again offered help in due cooperation to India, for joint investigations into the Mumbai attacks.

On 10 March, India gave Interpol the DNA of the attackers.

==== Military preparations ====
On 7 December, Senator John McCain relayed a message from Prime Minister Manmohan Singh to a group of Pakistanis at a lunch in Lahore that if Pakistan did not arrest those involved with the attacks, India would begin aerial attacks against Pakistan.

A report for Canada's Talk Nation Radio on the regional tensions arising from the Mumbai attacks
Journalist Graham Usher discusses the tensions between Pakistan and India arising from the attacks. In the report from Islamabad, broadcast on 9 December 2008, he also discusses the regional role of the United States.

Pakistan Information Minister Sherry Rehman said that "Our air force is on alert, and ready to face any eventuality". Ali Abbas Rizvi quoted a source as saying, "They [India] may have wanted to know whether the PAF was on five-minute alert or cockpit alert, and thereby find out the reaction time".

On 19 December, private intelligence agency Stratfor, in its latest report, said, "Indian military operations against targets in Pakistan have in fact been prepared, and await the signal to go forward". They also wrote that, "Indian military preparations, unlike previous cases, will be carried out in stealth". India's Border Security Force (BSF) has been put on high alert on the western sector, as well as the eastern sector, in order to prevent terrorist infiltration.

On 22 December, Pakistan began combat air patrol (CAP) over several cities, including Islamabad, Lahore, and Rawalpindi, which began a panic among Pakistani civilians. Many Pakistani civilians "started making frantic phone calls to media house[s] to enquire about whether a war has been declared". Pakistani Foreign Minister Shah Mehmood Qureshi said, "Pakistan defence forces and armed forces are ready to face any challenge, as Pak has the full right to defend itself". Pakistani PM Yousuf Raza Gilani said, "Pakistan remains united and is ready to fight anyone to defend itself". Pakistani Defense Minister Ahmad Mukhtar Chaudhry said, "If India tried to thrust war, then the armed forces of Pakistan have all the potential and right to defend [Pakistan]".

According to Pakistani media, India had started deploying troops along the Rajasthan border, and had tightened security in and around the defence airstrips. More radars and quick reaction teams were then deployed along the India-Pakistan border. Indian forces were on regular firing exercises at locations, like Lathi Firing Range in Jaisalmer, Mahsan in Bikaner, Suratgarh and Ganganagar.

On 23 December, Kamal Hyder, Al Jazeera's correspondent in Pakistan, wrote that the Pakistani "navy, air force and army were on red alert" and that "the chiefs of Pakistan's three armed forces were holding what had been described as an emergency meeting at general headquarters in Rawalpindi". He also wrote that "[t]he Pakistani air force have been seen visibly in a number of locations flying close to the Pakistani-India border, in what is being described as an aggressive patrolling mode, following reports that India is planning pre-emptive strikes against locations in Pakistan". A Pakistani airforce spokesperson said "[i]n view of the current environment, the PAF has enhanced its vigilance". Pakistani army chief General Ashfaq Parvez Kayani, said that Pakistan would mount an equal response "within minutes", to any Indian attack. Pakistan continued to combat air patrol over several cities.

The Taliban and affiliated groups openly declared their solidarity with Pakistan. The banned Tehrik-e-Taliban had proclaimed that they would send "thousands of (their) well-armed militants" in order to wage jihad against India if war should break out. Hundreds of would-be bombers were equipped with suicide jackets and explosive-laden vehicles.

On 24 December, P.K. Barbora, the air officer commanding-in-chief of Western Air Command, said "[t]he IAF has earmarked 5,000 targets in Pakistan. But whether we will cross the LoC or the International Border to hit the enemy targets will have to be decided by the political leadership of the country". India Today reported that "Indian Air Force fighter planes are engaged in round the clock sorties. An unusual hectic activity of Indian Air Force has been visible along the border for past some days". On the same day, Stratfor confirmed that "the state government of Rajasthan has ordered residents of its border villages to be prepared for relocation". President Asif Ali Zardari said "We will defend the country till the last drop of our blood", and "[w]e will defend the country till our last breath". Pakistan began deploying warplanes to forward air bases.

On 25 December, however, the ruling UPA government in India played down apprehensions of an imminent military conflagration. The Indian Prime Minister made it clear that "nobody wanted war". The Indian Air Force also downplayed the sorties by PAF fighter jets, saying it was an air defence exercise. Officials in New Delhi were amused at Pakistan air force's attempt to create war hysteria in the region. However, R. C. Dhyani, DIG of Rajasthan frontier BSF, said, "[a] lot of military movement is being noticed in districts just across the international border for the last few days, which is not normal" and "Pakistan has deployed more troops across border".

Leader of the House Raza Rabbani, said that any surgical strike into its territory would be taken as an act of war and would be repulsed with "full force", and that "[e]ach and every inch of the country will be safeguarded". India moved MiG-29s to Hindon air base, located near New Delhi, in order "to protect the capital from aerial threats". The Pakistani city of Mianwali began a blackout.

Pakistan continued deployment, and moved the 10th Brigade to the outskirts of Lahore, and the 3rd Armored Brigade to Jhelum. The 10th Infantry Division and the 11th Infantry Division had been placed on high alert. The Indian Army deployed quick reaction teams (QRTs) along the border, which "precede the movement of bridging equipment – to cross canals in Punjab – and of heavy guns".

Amir Mir of Daily News and Analysis wrote that "Pakistan's military leadership has advised president Asif Ali Zardari to take back his statement made last month, that his country would not be the first to use nuclear weapons in the event of a conflict with India".

On 26 December, Pakistan cancelled all military leave, and activated contacts with friendly countries and military partners. Pakistan deployed troops to "protect vital points along the Line of Control (LoC) in Jammu and Kashmir and the international border with India". Pakistani Foreign Minister Quresh said that, "if war is imposed, we will respond to it like a brave, self-respecting nation". Indian Prime Minister Manmohan Singh held a second meeting of the Nuclear Command Authority to "discuss all the options available to India".

Pakistan deployed the 14th Infantry Division to Kasur and Sialkot, close to the border. India advised its citizens not to travel to Pakistan. Indian Prime Minister Manmohan Singh met with the chiefs of the Indian air force, army, and navy.

On 27 December, India's largest opposition party, the Bharatiya Janata Party (BJP), called for all travel between India and Pakistan to be stopped, and for the recall of the Indian High Commissioner from Pakistan. The Pakistani Army alerted retired army personnel to be ready to be called back to active duty. On 28 December, Pakistan postponed all officer training courses.

On 29 December, the leaders of the Indian and Pakistani armies spoke over their red telephone, in order to avert an accidental nuclear war. The President of the BJP, Rajnath Singh, called for a joint India-US military action against Pakistan. John McCain said, "The Indians are on the verge of some kind of attack on Pakistan".

On 30 December, Pakistani media stated: "The service chiefs of all of the branches of India's military were told to stay in the country in order to achieve 'complete readiness'. All units that are on exercises have been ordered to remain so indefinitely, and to indicate any equipment or ammunition they need". However, this was not backed by Indian nor international media.

===== Pakistani deployments =====
The Pakistani military had cancelled all leave. Elements of the Pakistani Airforce had been deployed to frontline bases. The IV Corp, with 60,000 troops, has been deployed to Lahore. Pakistan had deployed the 3rd Armored Brigade to Jhelum, and the 10th Brigade, with 5,000 troops, to Lahore. The 10th Division had been deployed to Ichogul and the 11th Division had been deployed to Tilla. Pakistani Army units had been deployed to Kashmir and the Jammu sector of the border. The 14th Division, with 20,000 troops, had been deployed to Kasur and Sialkot.

===== Indian deployments =====
India had put its Border Security Force, India's border patrol agency, on high alert. Mig-29s have been deployed to Hindon air base, in order to protect New Delhi. Later IAF sources claimed that the move was a result of intelligence inputs of an air attack on Delhi. The Indian Navy had moved six warships, including the INS Jalashwa and the INS Ranveer, to the west coast.

=== Trials in Pakistan ===
Indian and Pakistani police had exchanged DNA evidence, photographs, and items found with the attackers, to piece together a detailed portrait of the Mumbai plot. Police in Pakistan had arrested seven people, including Hammad Amin Sadiq, a homoeopathic pharmacist, who arranged bank accounts and secured supplies, and he and six others began their formal trial on 3 October 2009, in Pakistan, though Indian authorities say the prosecution stopped well short of top Lashkar leaders.

=== Impact on the United States ===
U.S. officials feared an Indian military response and escalated tension between countries neighboring Pakistan in the wake of the siege. U.S. Secretary of State Condoleezza Rice called for Pakistan's cooperation in locating the perpetrators. At the request of President George W. Bush, Rice called on Islamabad to take direct action. White House spokeswoman Dana Perino emphasized the U.S. commitment to supporting India.

After visiting India, Condoleezza Rice travelled to Pakistan on 4 December 2008 to talk with the Pakistani government. Rice emphasized the necessity for Pakistan to take responsibility for actions committed using Pakistan's territory, even when those involved were not Pakistani.

Analysts in 2008 believed that Asif Ali Zardari's new government would face too much backlash should they extradite the individuals named by Indian authorities; two weeks after the attacks, posters and billboards in Pakistan were advertising Jamaat, with Hafiz Mohammed Saeed giving speeches to recruit for the group's jihad and leading prayers in a Lahore mosque.

An analysis by the Combating Terrorism Center at West Point focused on several issues that caused additional difficulty in ending the attacks, noting the need for different tactics should a similar situation occur in the U.S. SWAT teams in several U.S. metropolitan cities implemented training to deploy to multiple locations in direct response to the Mumbai attacks. Those measures were reflected in the immediate response to the 2013 Boston Marathon bombing.

A Stimson Center report analysing the response from the U.S. acknowledged the unprecedented sharing of evidence and intelligence with both India and Pakistan. It also concluded that Pakistan's government, through lack of action taken against the perpetrators, confirmed their refusal to take action when terror plots were carried out from Pakistani soil on targets in India.

The revelation of the participation of U.S. citizen and D.E.A. informant David Coleman Headley in aiding and abetting Lakshar led Indian authorities to conclude that his ties to the U.S. federal government were more extensive than were disclosed. Security officials in India have even stated that the warnings they received prior to the siege were a direct result of Headley's status as a U.S. operative.

=== Impact on the United Kingdom ===
==== Response reform ====
British police, examining their own capability to respond to such actions, determined that they would not be prepared enough to adequately handle the situation, admitting that they would likely need to request aid from the military. Between 2008 and 2017, drills were executed across the UK, including operation "Wooden Pride", that were initiated in direct response to this event.

==== Civil compensation ====
Following the attacks, British politicians accused the government of "moral failure". The compensation scheme established following bombings in London in 2005 only applied to those injured on UK soil, leaving British citizens to apply for financial aid for medical and mental health expenses incurred in the aftermath from the Red Cross or through civil personal injury claims. Travel insurance would be another avenue to seek relief, except that the policies issued generally did not cover acts of terrorism.

In 2009, the UK government did promise to change the law to include citizens injured in attacks outside the UK. In 2011, it was reported that the government did not intend to go forward with the plan that would provide monetary relief for survivors of terror attacks abroad. As of April 2024, the program to provide compensation didn't cover any attack that injured a British citizen occurring before 27 November 2012.

Legal action was brought in the High Court in London in 2012 against Tata Group and the Taj Hotel. Justice Stewart, in hearing arguments over where suit should be brought, decided that London would be the appropriate forum rather than India.

=== Citizens' movements ===
The attack triggered a chain of citizens' movements across India. People from all walks of life hit the streets with candles and placards to pay tributes to the victims of the tragedy almost every weekend after the 26/11 incident. While NSG commandos, Mumbai police officials, hotel staffers, etc. who participated in the operation to eliminate the terrorists became overnight heroes, the wrath of the citizens was directed towards the Government's inability to ensure adequate security to its citizens, and soon led to the chain of resignations, including that of the Indian Home Minister, Shivraj Patil and Maharashtra Chief Minister Vilasrao Deshmukh. The gathering of citizens at the Gateway of India in Mumbai was unprecedented and historic. From India Gate and Jantar Mantar in New Delhi to marketplaces and street corners all across the country, India witnessed candlelight vigils by the common people. Some organised initiatives to carry forward the citizens' movement included a Hindustan Times-CNN-IBN Initiative, India Today Group's War Against Terror, and Hindustan Hamara Citizens' Initiative, besides a large number of blogs on the issue. The Muslim community in India condemned the attack and refused to allow burial of the bodies of the dead terrorists in their graveyards.

In addition, anti-Pakistan protests took place in Mumbai and nationwide in the aftermath of the attack. During the protests, demonstrators shouted Pakistan Murdabad(meaning Down with Pakistan), and many demanding cutting any ties with Pakistan.

=== Impact on Law Enforcement and Intelligence ===
The attack drew major scrutiny across law enforcement and intelligence officials, particularly Mumbai Police. A report produced by the Pradhan Commission, appointed in the aftermath of the attack, revealed that law enforcement officials were equipped with antiquated weaponry from World War II, which was insufficient and inadequate to deal with the terrorists, who were trained by the Pakistan Army and equipped with AK-47 assault rifles. This was also coupled with poor marksmanship training, lack of a commando style force like the SWAT in the United States, and bureaucratic inefficiency when coordinating with the National Security Guard while trying to neutralize the terrorists. The antiquated weaponry was a notable factor to indicate a lack of police reforms, as many police forces across all states continued to use the colonial Police Act, 1861 despite Supreme Court orders to replace with a new Police Act and initiate major reforms, and as per the Constitution, policing is a state subject.

Given the intensity of the attack, the Maharashtra Government created a new unit called Force One by the first anniversary of the attack, while more NSG bases were formed across different parts of the country, including Mumbai. Force One is expected to be part of the initial response to a terror strike. Furthermore, another law enforcement division called the National Investigation Agency was formed on the lines of United States Federal Bureau of Investigation, for counter-terrorism actions.

== See also ==
- Force One (Mumbai Police)
- Abdul Rauf Asghar
- Devika Rotawan
