= Ministry of Cultural Affairs (Maharashtra) =

Government ministry in Maharashtra

Ministry of Culture Affairs Government of Maharashtra
- सांस्कृतिक कार्य विभाग, महाराष्ट्र शासन
- Seal of the state of Maharashtra

- Building of Administrative Headquarters of Mumbai

Ministry overview
- Jurisdiction: (India) Maharashtra
- Headquarters: Mantralay, Mumbai
- Minister responsible: Ashish Shelar, Cabinet Minister
- Deputy Minister responsible: Vacant, TBD since 29 June 2022, Minister of State
- Parent department: Government of Maharashtra
- Website: cultural.maharashtra.gov.in

The Ministry of Cultural Affairs is a ministry in the Government of Maharashtra. Ministry is responsible for promoting regional culture.

The Ministry is headed by a cabinet level minister. Ashish Shelar is current Minister of Cultural Affairs. Cabinet Minister is assisted by the Minister of State. Vacant, TBD since 29 June 2022.

== Head office ==
Minister of Cultural Affairs सांस्कृतिक कार्य मंत्री
- Emblem of India

- Flag of India

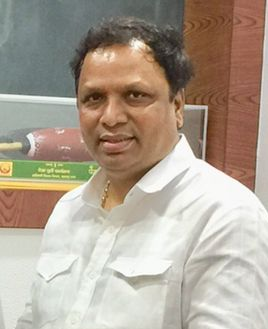
- Incumbent; Ashish Shelar since 21 December 2024
- Ministry of Cultural Affairs (Maharashtra)
- Style: The Honourable
- Abbreviation: Cabinet Minister
- Member of: State Cabinet
- Reports to: Chief Minister, & Maharashtra Legislature
- Seat: Mantralaya, Mumbai
- Appointer: Governor on the advice of the Chief Minister
- Term length: 5 years
- Precursor: Devendra Fadnavis (2024-2024)
- Inaugural holder: Gopalrao Bajirao Khedkar (1960-1962)
- Formation: 1 May 1960
- Deputy: Vacant, TBD; since 29 June 2022

== Cabinet Ministers ==
No.	Portrait	Minister (Constituency)	Term of office			Political party	Ministry	Chief Minister
No.	Portrait	Minister (Constituency)	From	To	Period	Political party	Ministry	Chief Minister
Minister of Cultural Affairs
01		Marotrao Kannamwar (MLA for Saoli Constituency No. 73- Chandrapur District) (Legislative Assembly)	01 May 1960	07 March 1962	1 year, 310 days	Indian National Congress	Yashwantrao I	Yashwantrao Chavan
02		Gopalrao Bajirao Khedkar (MLA for Akot Constituency No. 28- Akola District) (Legislative Assembly)	08 March 1962	19 November 1962	256 days	Indian National Congress	Yashwantrao II	Yashwantrao Chavan
03		Parashuram Krishnaji Sawant (MLA for Chiplun Constituency No. 265- Ratnagiri District) (Legislative Assembly)	20 November 1962	24 November 1963	1 year, 4 days	Indian National Congress	Kannamwar l	Marotrao Kannamwar
04		Parashuram Krishnaji Sawant (MLA for Chiplun Constituency No. 265- Ratnagiri District) (Legislative Assembly) (Interim Chief Minister)	25 November 1962	04 December 1963	9 days	Indian National Congress	Sawant	Parashuram Krishnaji Sawant
05		Sheshrao Krishnarao Wankhede (MLA for Sawargoan Constituency No. 49- Nagpur District) (Legislative Assembly)	05 December 1963	01 March 1967	3 years, 86 days	Indian National Congress	Vasantrao I	Vasantrao Naik
06		Vasantrao Naik (MLA for Pusad Constituency No. 81- Yavatmal District) (Legislative Assembly) (Chief Minister)	01 March 1967	27 October 1969	2 years, 240 days	Indian National Congress	Vasantrao II	Vasantrao Naik
07		Pratibha Patil (MLA for Jalgaon City Constituency No. 13- Jalgaon District) (Legislative Assembly)	27 October 1969	13 March 1972	2 years, 138 days	Indian National Congress	Vasantrao II	Vasantrao Naik
08		Vasantrao Patil (MLA for Sangli Constituency No. 282- Sangli District) (Legislative Assembly)	13 March 1972	04 April 1973	1 year, 32 days	Indian National Congress	Vasantrao III	Vasantrao Naik
09		Yashwantrao Mohite (MLA for Karad South Constituency No. 260- Satara District) (Legislative Assembly)	04 April 1973	17 Match; 1974	347 days	Indian National Congress	Vasantrao III	Vasantrao Naik
10		Shankarrao Chavan (MLA for Bhokar Constituency No. 85- Nanded District) (Legislative Assembly)	17 Match; 1974	21 February 1975	341 days	Indian National Congress	Vasantrao III	Vasantrao Naik
11		Madhukar Dhanaji Chaudhari (MLA for Raver Constituency No. 11- Jalgaon District) (Legislative Assembly)	21 February 1975	16 April 1977	2 years, 54 days	Indian National Congress	Shankarrao I	Shankarrao Chavan
12		Dadasaheb Rupwate (MLC for Elected by MLAs Constituency No. 11 - Ahmednagar District) (Legislative Council)	17 April 1977	07 March 1978	1 year, 324 days	Indian National Congress	Vasantdada I	Vasantdada Patil
13		Nashikrao Tirpude (MLA for Bhandara Constituency No. 61- Bhandara District) (Legislative Assembly) (Deputy Chief Minister)	07 March 1978	18 July 1978	133 days	Indian National Congress (Indira)	Vasantdada II	Vasantdada Patil
14		Hashmukhbhai Upadhaya (MLA for Kandivali Constituency No. 161- Mumbai Suburban District) (Legislative Assembly)	18 July 1978	17 February 1980	1 year, 214 days	Janata Party	Pawar I	Sharad Pawar
15		Jayant Shridhar Tilak (MLC for Elected by MLAs Constituency No. 02 - Pune District) (Legislative Council)	09 June 1980	21 January 1982	1 year, 226 days	Indian National Congress	Antulay	Abdul Rahman Antulay
16		Babasaheb Bhosale (MLA for Nehrunagar Constituency No. 172- Mumbai Suburban District) (Legislative Assembly) (Chief Minister)	21 January 1982	02 February 1983	1 year, 12 days	Indian National Congress	Bhosale	Babasaheb Bhosale
17		Sushilkumar Shinde (MLA for Solapur City Central Constituency No. 249- Solapur District) (Legislative Assembly)	07 February 1983	05 March 1985	2 years, 26 days	Indian National Congress	Vasantdada III	Vasantdada Patil
18		Sushilkumar Shinde (MLA for Solapur City Central Constituency No. 249- Solapur District) (Legislative Assembly)	12 March 1985	03 June 1985	83 days	Indian National Congress	Vasantdada IV	Vasantdada Patil
19		Jawaharlal Darda (MLC for Elected by MLAs Constituency No. 19 - Yavatmal District) (Legislative Council)	03 June 1985	12 March 1986	282 days	Indian National Congress	Nilangekar	Shivajirao Patil Nilangekar
20		Ram Meghe (MLA for Daryapur Constituency No. 40- Amravati District) (Legislative Assembly)	12 March 1986	26 June 1988	2 years, 106 days	Indian National Congress	Shankarrao II	Shankarrao Chavan
21		Sudhakarrao Naik (MLA for Pusad Constituency No. 81- Yavatmal District) (Legislative Assembly)	26 June 1988	03 March 1990	1 year, 250 days	Indian National Congress	Pawar II	Sharad Pawar
22		Pushpatai Hirey (MLA for Dabhadi Constituency No. 74- Nashik District) (Legislative Assembly)	03 March 1990	25 June 1991	1 year, 114 days	Indian National Congress	Pawar III	Sharad Pawar
23		Sushilkumar Shinde (MLA for Solapur City Central Constituency No. 249- Solapur District) (Legislative Assembly)	25 June 1991	26 December 1991	184 days	Indian National Congress	Sudhakarrao	Sudhakarrao Naik
24		Vijaysinh Mohite-Patil (MLA for Malshiras Constituency No. 254- Solapur District) (Legislative Assembly)	26 December 1991	22 February 1993	1 year, 58 days	Indian National Congress	Sudhakarrao	Sudhakarrao Naik
25		Vilasrao Deshmukh (MLA for Latur City Constituency No. 235- Latur District) (Legislative Assembly)	06 March 1993	18 November 1994	1 year, 257 days	Indian National Congress	Pawar IV	Sharad Pawar
26		Eknath Khadse (MLA for Muktainagar Constituency No. 20- Jalgaon District) (Legislative Assembly)	14 March 1995	01 February 1999	3 years, 324 days	Bharatiya Janata Party	Joshi	Manohar Joshi
27		Diwakar Raote (MLC for Elected by MLAs Constituency No. 20 - Mumbai City District) (Legislative Council)	01 February 1999	11 May 1999	99 days	Shiv Sena	Rane	Narayan Rane
28		Dattatraya Rane (MLA for Shivadi Constituency No. 183- Mumbai City District (Legislative Assembly)	11 May 1999	17 October 1999	159 days	Bharatiya Janata Party	Rane	Narayan Rane
29		Vilasrao Deshmukh (MLA for Latur City Constituency No. 235- Latur District) (Legislative Assembly) (Chief Minister)	19 October 1999	27 October 1999	8 days	Indian National Congress	Deshmukh I	Vilasrao Deshmukh
30		Ramkrishna More (MLA for Khed Constituency No. 219- Pune District) (Legislative Assembly)	27 October 1999	16 January 2003	3 years, 81 days	Indian National Congress	Deshmukh I	Vilasrao Deshmukh
31		Ramkrishna More (MLA for Khed Constituency No. 219- Pune District) (Legislative Assembly)	18 January 2003	01 November 2004	1 year, 295 days	Indian National Congress	Sushilkumar	Sushilkumar Shinde
32		Vilasrao Deshmukh (MLA for Latur City Constituency No. 235- Latur District) (Legislative Assembly) (Chief Minister)	01 November 2004	01 December 2008	4 years, 30 days	Indian National Congress	Deshmukh II	Vilasrao Deshmukh
33		Harshvardhan Patil (MLA for Indapur Constituency No. 200- Pune District (Legislative Assembly)	08 December 2008	06 November 2009	333 days	Independent Supported Party (Indian National Congress)	Ashok I	Ashok Chavan
34		Ashok Chavan (MLA for Bhokar Constituency No. 85- Nanded District) (Legislative Assembly) (Chief Minister)	07 November 2009	10 November 2010	1 year, 3 days	Indian National Congress	Ashok II	Ashok Chavan
35		Sanjay Deotale (MLA for Warora Constituency No. 75- Chandrapur District (Legislative Assembly)	11 November 2010	26 September 2014	3 years, 319 days	Indian National Congress	Prithviraj	Prithviraj Chavan
36		Vinod Tawde (MLA for Borivali Constituency No. 152- Mumbai Suburban District (Legislative Assembly)	31 October 2014	12 November 2019	5 years, 12 days	Bharatiya Janata Party	Fadnavis I	Devendra Fadnavis
37		Devendra Fadnavis (MLA for Nagpur South West Constituency No. 52- Nagpur District) (Legislative Assembly) (Chief_Minister); In Charge	23 November 2019	28 November 2019	5 days	Bharatiya Janata Party	Fadnavis II	Devendra Fadnavis
38		Subhash Desai (MLC for Elected by MLAs Constituency No. 09 - Mumbai Suburban District) (Legislative Council)	28 November 2019	30 December 2019	32 days	Shiv Sena	Thackeray	Uddhav Thackeray
39		Amit Deshmukh (MLA for Latur City Constituency No. 235- Latur District) (Legislative Assembly)	30 December 2019	29 June 2022	2 years, 181 days	Indian National Congress	Thackeray	Uddhav Thackeray
40		Eknath Shinde (MLA for Kopri-Pachpakhadi Constituency No. 147- Thane District) (Legislative Assembly) (Chief Minister); In Charge	30 June 2022	14 August 2022	45 days	Shiv Sena (2022–present)	Eknath	Eknath Shinde
41		Sudhir Mungantiwar (MLA for Ballarpur Constituency No. 72- Chandrapur District) (Legislative Assembly)	14 August 2022	26 November 2024	2 years, 135 days	Bharatiya Janata Party	Eknath	Eknath Shinde
42		Devendra Fadnavis (MLA for Nagpur South West Constituency No. 52- Nagpur District) (Legislative Assembly) (Chief_Minister); In Charge	05 December 2024	21 December 2024	16 days	Bharatiya Janata Party	Fadnavis III	Devendra Fadnavis
43		Ashish Shelar (MLA for Vandre West Constituency No. 177- Mumbai Suburban District) (Legislative Assembly)	21 December 2024	Incumbent	1 year, 261 days	Bharatiya Janata Party	Fadnavis III	Devendra Fadnavis

== Ministers of State ==
No.	Portrait	Deputy Minister (Constituency)	Term of office			Political party	Ministry	Minister	Chief Minister
No.	Portrait	Deputy Minister (Constituency)	From	To	Period	Political party	Ministry	Minister	Chief Minister
Deputy Minister of Cultural Affairs
Vacant			23 November 2019	28 November 2019	5 days	NA	Fadnavis II	Devendra Fadnavis	Devendra Fadnavis
01		Rajendra Patil Yadravkar (MLA for Shirol Constituency No. 280- Kolhapur District) (Legislative Assembly)	30 December 2019	27 June 2022	2 years, 179 days	Shiv Sena	Thackeray	Amit Deshmukh	Uddhav Thackeray
02		Aditi Sunil Tatkare (MLA for Shrivardhan Constituency No. 193- Raigad District) (Legislative Assembly); Additional_Charge	27 June 2022	29 June 2022	2 days	Nationalist Congress Party	Thackeray	Amit Deshmukh	Uddhav Thackeray
Vacant			30 June 2022	26 November 2024	2 years, 149 days	NA	Eknath	Eknath Shinde (2022 - 2022); Sudhir Mungantiwar (2022 – 2024)	Eknath Shinde
Vacant			21 December 2024	incumbent	1 year, 261 days	NA	Fadnavis III	Ashish Shelar (2024 – Present)	Devendra Fadnavis

== Cultural centers ==
Ministry has various cultural centers across Maharashtra. Urdu Culture Center in Nanded is named after Bollywood actor Dilip Kumar.
