= Maharashtra State Film Award for Best Documentary =

Indian film award

- Awarded for: Best Documentary in Marathi
- Sponsored by: Ministry of Cultural Affairs (Maharashtra)
- Reward: ₹50,000 (US$530)
- First award: 1984
- Final award: 2005

The Maharashtra State Film Award for Best Documentary is an award that was presented annually at the Maharashtra State Film Awards to the best documentary film in Marathi cinema film. The awards are managed directly by the Government of Maharashtra under the Ministry of Cultural Affairs. The category recognized documentary films relevant to Maharashtra and its people. The recipients were selected by a jury appointed by the state government. The Best Documentary award was first presented in 1985, twenty-two years after the inaugural awards in 1963, and was last awarded in 2005, after which the category was discontinued.

== Achievement records ==
Individuals with two or more Best Documentary awards:

Wins	Recipients
8	Film Division
5	Ministry of Cultural Affairs (Maharashtra)

== Winners ==
List of documentaries, showing the year and director(s)/Producer
Year	Film(s)	Director/Producer(s)	Refs.
1984	Bada Media	Manohar Varpe	
1985	Baburao Painter	Ministry of Cultural Affairs (Maharashtra)	
1986	Hi Daulat Khari	Supradnya	
1987	Navin Bharud	NFDC	
1988	Goshta Kamgar Kalyanchi	Maharashtra Kalyan Mandal	
1989	Adhunik Leni	Ministry of Cultural Affairs (Maharashtra)	
1991	Baga Fulvu Fal Zadanchya	Ministry of Cultural Affairs (Maharashtra)	
1991	Aakhri Boond	Mumbai Film Sector	
1992	Anandibai Joshi Kaal Aani Kartrutva	Saleel Chitra	
1993	Aala Khushit Samandar	Ministry of Cultural Affairs (Maharashtra)	
1994	Muktangan	Ministry of Cultural Affairs (Maharashtra)	
1995	The Tragedy	Film Division	
1996	Jaye Toh Jaye Kaha	Film Division	
1997	Me Tumchya Sathi Abhimaanspad Asel	Film Division	
1998	Haati Tichya Paati Ujjwal Bhavishya Sathi	Film Division	
1999	Dharavi Ek Navi Pahat Bhavishyasathi	Film Division	
2000	Kuskarlelya Kalika	Film Division	
2001	Aaple Mitra Aaple Police	Film Division	
2002	Not Awarded		
2003	Not Awarded		
2004	Girni	Film and Television Institute of India	
2005	Aaple Mitra Aaple Police (Part 2)	Film Division	
