= Latur City Assembly constituency =

Constituency of the Maharashtra legislative assembly in India

Coordinates: 18.40°N 76.57°E

Latur City
- Constituency No. 235 for the Maharashtra Legislative Assembly

Constituency details
- Country: India
- Region: Western India
- State: Maharashtra
- District: Latur
- Lok Sabha constituency: Latur
- Established: 1951
- Total electors: 400,145
- Reservation: None

Member of Legislative Assembly
- 15th Maharashtra Legislative Assembly
- Incumbent Amit Deshmukh
- Party: INC
- Alliance: MVA
- Elected year: 2024

Latur City Assembly constituency is one of the 288 Vidhan Sabha (legislative assembly) constituencies of Maharashtra state in western India. This constituency is located in the Latur district. It is the 16th largest city in Maharashtra with the district headquarters located in the city. The district comes under Marathwada region of Maharashtra, geographically located between 17°52′ North to 18°50′ North and 76°18′ East to 79°12′ East in the Deccan plateau. It has an average elevation of 631 metres (2,070 ft) above mean sea level. The entire district is on the Balaghat plateau, 540 to 638 metres from the mean sea level.

Cabinet Minister for Medical education & Cultural affairs, Amit Vilasrao Deshmukh is the current MLA of the constituency, representing the Indian National Congress.

== History ==
After the delimitation of the legislative assembly constituencies in 2008, the erstwhile Latur Assembly constituency was divided into Latur City and Latur Rural constituencies.

In Latur City Assembly constituency the Indian National Congress is the strongest party.

Vilasrao Deshmukh, Former Chief Minister of Maharashtra, represented the seat five times in the Maharashtra Legislative Assembly. He was elected for three consecutive terms from the seat till 1995. From 1999, he was elected for two consecutive terms until 2008.

== Members of the Legislative Assembly ==
Year	Member	Party
Before 2009 : See Latur
2009	Amit Deshmukh	Indian National Congress
2014	Amit Deshmukh	Indian National Congress
2019	Amit Deshmukh	Indian National Congress
2024	Amit Deshmukh	Indian National Congress

== Election results ==
=== Assembly Election 2024 ===
2024 Maharashtra Legislative Assembly election : Latur City
Party	Candidate	Votes	%	±%
INC	Amit Vilasrao Deshmukh	114,110	45.19%	▼7.47
BJP	Dr. Archana Patil Chakurkar	106,712	42.26%	▲8.75
VBA	Vinod Somprakash Khatke	26,616	10.54%	▼1.12
NOTA	None of the Above	642	0.25%	▼0.09
Margin of victory		7,398	2.93%	▼16.22
Turnout		253,135	63.26%	▲6.44
Total valid votes		252,493		
Registered electors		400,145		▲7.43
INC hold		Swing	▼7.47	

=== Assembly Election 2019 ===
2019 Maharashtra Legislative Assembly election : Latur City
Party	Candidate	Votes	%	±%
INC	Amit Vilasrao Deshmukh	111,156	52.67%	▼6.31
BJP	Shailesh Govindkumar Lahoti	70,741	33.52%	▼1.08
VBA	Rajasab Bashumiya Maniyar	24,604	11.66%	New
NOTA	None of the Above	727	0.34%	▲0.08
Margin of victory		40,415	19.15%	▼5.23
Turnout		211,948	56.90%	▼5.15
Total valid votes		211,060		
Registered electors		372,474		▲13.47
INC hold		Swing	▼6.31	

=== Assembly Election 2014 ===
2014 Maharashtra Legislative Assembly election : Latur City
Party	Candidate	Votes	%	±%
INC	Amit Vilasrao Deshmukh	119,656	58.97%	▼5.93
BJP	Lahoti Shailesh Govindkumar	70,191	34.59%	New
NCP	Pathan Murtujkhan Basidkhan	4,047	1.99%	New
SS	Pappubhai Urf Shripad Kulkarni	2,323	1.14%	▼10.29
BSP	Bansode Raghunath Waghoji	2,202	1.09%	▼12.43
NOTA	None of the Above	539	0.27%	New
Margin of victory		49,465	24.38%	▼27.01
Turnout		203,453	61.98%	▲2.19
Total valid votes		202,904		
Registered electors		328,265		▲12.41
INC hold		Swing	▼5.93	

=== Assembly Election 2009 ===
2009 Maharashtra Legislative Assembly election : Latur City
Party	Candidate	Votes	%	±%
INC	Amit Vilasrao Deshmukh	113,006	64.91%	New
BSP	Kayyum Khan Pathan	23,526	13.51%	New
SS	Shripad Madhukarrao Kulkarni	19,905	11.43%	New
Independent	Adv. Annarao Govindrao Patil	10,228	5.87%	New
Independent	Adv. Yevate Patil Shrimanth Arjun	1,400	0.80%	New
Margin of victory		89,480	51.39%	
Turnout		174,194	59.65%	
Total valid votes		174,108		
Registered electors		292,030		
INC win (new seat)				
