= Hey...Yehii To Haii Woh! =

- Directed by: Rakesh Sarang
- Country of origin: India
- Original language: Hindi

Production
- Producers: Dheeraj Kumar; Zuby Koochar
- Cinematography: Rakesh Sarang
- Production company: Creative Eye Limited

Original release
- Network: Star One
- Release: 1 November 2004 – 2005

Related
- Amores de Mercado

Hey...Yehii To Haii Woh! is a Hindi series aired on Star One from 1 November 2004 to 2005. It is the story about twins who are separated at the time of birth.

== Story ==
It is a story about the twins Raj and Sameer who are separated at the time of birth by their father, Babu Kamath, who deceives his wife Bhavna and sells one of his sons (Raj) to a multi-millionaire Jaydev Thapar, who is childless. Due to an accident they switch places without knowing the existence of a twin brother. This is an adaptation of Amor descarado, the American version of the Chilean Amores de Mercado, created by Fernando Aragón and Arnaldo Madrid, and written by Alejandro Cabrera, Arnaldo Madrid, René Arcos, Marcelo Leonart and Larissa Contreras. It was a smash hit, with rating so far not outnumbered in Chile. The American version was written by Delia Betancourt and Roberto Stopello. Based on the American version there is a Greek version called Μια Στιγμή Δυο Ζωές, a Spanish version called Almas Gemelas (in which the twin brothers were turned into twin sisters), and an Indian version called Hey...Yehii To Haii Woh!. The Colombian Amores de Mercado is not at all related neither with the Chilean nor the American version.

== Cast ==
- Gaurav Chanana as Sameer Kamath/Raj Kamath
- Hemant Choudhary as Babu Kamath (Main Antagonist)
- Natasha Rana as Bhavna Babu Kamath
- Amrapali Gupta as Manju Kamath
- Parineeta Borthakur as Puja
- Kanika Kohli as Simmi
- Aditi Pratap as Leena
- Major Vikramjeet as Jaydev Thapar
- Meghna Malik as Antara Thapar
- Sonal Pendse as Neha
- Sandeep Rajora as Pran Thapar
- Kanika Maheshwari as Shahana
- Akshay Singh as Dasgupta
- Karishma Mehta as Dr. Varsha
