= Maan (Indian TV series) =

Indian television series

Maan (English: Honour) is an Indian soap opera television series produced by Sphere Origins that aired on Metro and Metro Gold from 2001 to 2002. The show is a family drama centered around a Punjabi family – the Maans – in Mumbai. The show was written by Pawan K Sethhi and Satyam Tripathi.

== Plot ==
Daarji, the family patriarch, runs a business with his three sons. He lives in a house in Mumbai with his sons and their families. He had one more son, who died, and his widow, Amrit lives with them. His sister Bi Ji, played by Suhasini Mulay, also lived with the family.

== Cast ==
- Unknown as Daarji
- Suhasini Mulay as Biji
- Salim Shah as Roshan Maan (Khushi's father)
- Sadhana Singh as Ginny's mother
- Sadiya Siddiqui as Ginni/ Gunwant Kaur Maan
- Sanjeet Bedi as Kuldeep Singh Maan
- Rituraj Singh as Kanwaljeet Singh Maan
- Achint Kaur as Sanjana Maan
- Shruti Seth as Khushi/ Khuswant Kaur Maan
- Kanchan Mirchandani as Amrit Maan
- Aditi Pratap as Sahiba
