= Aditi Deshmukh =

Indian television actress

- Born: Pune, Maharashtra, India
- Years active: 2002
- Spouse: Amit Deshmukh
- Children: 2
- Family: NA

Aditi was born as Aditi Ghorpade in a Marathi family in Pune, Maharashtra to Pratap Ghorpade and Shailaja Ghorpade. She was raised in Bangalore and Delhi.

== Personal life ==
Aditi married Congress politician and MLA Amit Deshmukh, son of former chief minister of Maharashtra, Vilasrao Deshmukh on 28 February 2008. The couple have two sons named Avir and Avan.

== Career ==
Pratap made her acting debut in 2000 with Koshish - Ek Aashaa. From 2001 to 2002, she played Sahiba in Maan. Pratap then played Princess Sunayna in Hatim opposite Romiit Raaj, from 2003 to 2004. From 2004 to 2005, she played Leena in Hey...Yehii To Haii Woh!.

Pratap played Aditi Singh opposite Ashish Kapoor in Saat Phere – Saloni Ka Safar from 2005 to 2007. In 2006, she made her film debut with Banaras: A Mystic Love Story, where she played Anjali. From 2006 to 2007, she played a role in Risshton Ki Dor, which marked her last screen appearance.

== Philanthropy ==
Deshmukh is a philanthropist and social entrepreneur. She is the founder of a farm-to-table venture, 21 Organic. She is also the co-founder of Namaskar Ayurved.

As the executive trustee of the Vilasrao Deshmukh Foundation, she is helping 26 villages in Latur become sustainable, through various initiatives. Deshmukh is involved in the development of women, children, the environment and Indian culture. She is also the Head of Goldcrest Group of Schools.

== Filmography ==
=== Films ===
Year	Title	Role	Notes
2006	Banaras: A Mystic Love Story	Anjali	

=== Television ===
Year	Title	Role	Ref.
2000–2001	Koshish - Ek Aashaa	Neeraj's sister	
2001–2002	Maan	Sahiba	
2003–2004	Hatim	Rajkumari Sunaina	
2004–2005	Hey...Yehii To Haii Woh!	Leena	
2005–2007	Saat Phere – Saloni Ka Safar	Aditi Singh	
2006–2007	Risshton Ki Dor	Unknown	
