= Shivajirao Patil Kavhekar =

Indian politician

Member of Maharashtra Legislative Assembly
- In office 1995–1999
- Preceded by: Vilasrao Deshmukh
- Succeeded by: Vilasrao Deshmukh
- Constituency: Latur Assembly constituency

Personal details
- Born: Shivajirao Balwantrao Patil Kavhekar Kavha, Latur District, Maharashtra
- Citizenship: Indian
- Party: Bharatiya Janata Party (2019–Present), (2003–2009)
- Other political affiliations: Indian National Congress (2009–2019); Nationalist Congress Party (1999-2003); Janata Dal (S) (1999-1999); Janata Dal (1995-1999)
- Children: Ajeet Patil, Ranjeet Patil, Ashwini Patil
- Occupation: Politician

Shivajirao Patil Kavhekar is the former Member of Legislative Assembly from Maharashtra in the Government of Maharashtra during 1995–1999. He joined Indian National Congress on 2 October 2009. Prior to joining Congress he Contested Latur seat from the Bharatiya Janata Party (BJP).

== Political career ==
Kavhekar, who defeated Vilasrao Deshmukh in the 1995 Assembly polls from Latur. Kavhekar, who as a Janata Dal candidate defeated Vilasrao Deshmukh by over 30,000 votes. Later in 1999 he joined hands with Nationalist Congress Party and tried his hand in the Assembly polls.

Kavhekar quit Nationalist Congress Party and joined BJP. On 2 October 2009, he joined Indian National Congress party at Tilak Bhavan in the presence of Manikrao Thakare and withdrew his nominations from Latur City and Latur Rural Assembly seats. Recently in 2019 he again joined BJP.
