= Latur Assembly constituency =

Constituency of the Maharashtra Legislative Assembly

Coordinates: 18.955°N 72.817°E

Latur
- Former constituency for the Maharashtra Legislative Assembly

Constituency details
- Country: India
- Region: Western India
- State: Maharashtra
- Lok Sabha constituency: Latur
- Established: 1951
- Abolished: 2008

Latur was one of the 288 constituencies in the Maharashtra Legislative Assembly from Latur district, in Maharashtra. The constituency existed until the 2004 elections and was part of Latur Lok Sabha constituency. It became defunct after the constituency map was redrawn.

== Members of the Legislative Assembly ==
| Election | Member | Party |
|---|---|---|
| 1952 | Vinayak Rao Koratkar | Indian National Congress |
| 1957 | Keshavrao Sonawane | Indian National Congress |
| 1962 | Keshavrao Sonawane | Indian National Congress |
| 1967 | V. R. Kaldate | Samyukta Socialist Party |
| 1972 | Shivraj Vishwanath Patil | Indian National Congress |
| 1978 | Shivraj Vishwanath Patil | Indian National Congress |
| 1980 | Vilasrao Dagadojirao Deshmukh | Indian National Congress (I) |
| 1985 | Vilasrao Dagadojirao Deshmukh | Indian National Congress |
| 1990 | Vilasrao Dagadojirao Deshmukh | Indian National Congress |
| 1995 | Shivajirao Patil Kavhekar | Janata Dal |
| 1999 | Vilasrao Dagadojirao Deshmukh | Indian National Congress |
| 2004 | Vilasrao Dagadojirao Deshmukh | Indian National Congress |

== Election results ==
=== Assembly Election 2004 ===
2004 Maharashtra Legislative Assembly election : Latur
| Party | Candidate | Votes | % | ±% |
|---|---|---|---|---|
| INC | Vilasrao Dagadojirao Deshmukh | 147,033 | 61.50% | ▼1.73 |
| BJP | Shivajirao Patil Kavhekar | 70,000 | 29.28% | ▲9.56 |
| BSP | Shaikh Shafi Bashasaheb | 10,328 | 4.32% | New |
| SP | Manoharrao Eknathrao Gomare | 5,776 | 2.42% | New |
| Independent | Dnysho Alias Kondekar Vijayprakash | 3,428 | 1.43% | New |
| Margin of victory | | 77,033 | 32.22% | ▼11.29 |
| Turnout | | 239,139 | 67.48% | ▼2.96 |
| Total valid votes | | 239,078 | | |
| Registered electors | | 354,383 | | ▲27.21 |
| INC hold | | Swing | ▼1.73 | |

=== Assembly Election 1999 ===
1999 Maharashtra Legislative Assembly election : Latur
| Party | Candidate | Votes | % | ±% |
|---|---|---|---|---|
| INC | Vilasrao Dagadojirao Deshmukh | 118,496 | 63.23% | ▲23.75 |
| BJP | Vikram Ganpatrao Gojamgunde | 36,963 | 19.72% | New |
| JD(S) | Shivajirao Patil Kavhekar | 22,199 | 11.85% | New |
| Independent | Lahu Narayan Waghmare | 4,781 | 2.55% | New |
| Independent | Chandmare Anurath Tataram | 1,318 | 0.70% | New |
| Independent | Shaikh Hanif Mustafa | 1,296 | 0.69% | New |
| Margin of victory | | 81,533 | 43.51% | ▲26.62 |
| Turnout | | 196,240 | 70.44% | ▼12.00 |
| Total valid votes | | 187,393 | | |
| Registered electors | | 278,575 | | ▲12.39 |
| INC gain from JD | | Swing | ▲6.86 | |

=== Assembly Election 1995 ===
1995 Maharashtra Legislative Assembly election : Latur
| Party | Candidate | Votes | % | ±% |
|---|---|---|---|---|
| JD | Shivajirao Patil Kavhekar | 112,901 | 56.37% | ▲28.17 |
| INC | Vilasrao Dagadojirao Deshmukh | 79,077 | 39.48% | ▼10.21 |
| SS | Pawar Narsing Kashinath | 3,308 | 1.65% | ▼1.53 |
| Margin of victory | | 33,824 | 16.89% | ▼4.60 |
| Turnout | | 204,329 | 82.44% | ▲17.20 |
| Total valid votes | | 200,280 | | |
| Registered electors | | 247,857 | | ▲11.98 |
| JD gain from INC | | Swing | ▲6.68 | |

=== Assembly Election 1990 ===
1990 Maharashtra Legislative Assembly election : Latur
| Party | Candidate | Votes | % | ±% |
|---|---|---|---|---|
| INC | Vilasrao Dagadojirao Deshmukh | 70,662 | 49.69% | ▼13.89 |
| JD | Gomare Manoharrao Eknathrao | 40,102 | 28.20% | New |
| Independent | Pradipkumar Ramgopalji Rathi | 24,121 | 16.96% | New |
| SS | Udgirkar Prabhakar Baburao | 4,516 | 3.18% | New |
| Margin of victory | | 30,560 | 21.49% | ▼15.32 |
| Turnout | | 144,398 | 65.24% | ▲0.02 |
| Total valid votes | | 142,202 | | |
| Registered electors | | 221,332 | | ▲29.79 |
| INC hold | | Swing | ▼13.89 | |

=== Assembly Election 1985 ===
1985 Maharashtra Legislative Assembly election : Latur
| Party | Candidate | Votes | % | ±% |
|---|---|---|---|---|
| INC | Vilasrao Dagadojirao Deshmukh | 69,599 | 63.58% | New |
| JP | Gomare Manoharrao Eknathrao | 29,303 | 26.77% | New |
| Independent | Maniyar Abdul Qadar Pashasab | 7,326 | 6.69% | New |
| Independent | Syed Nizamoddin Syed Mainoddin | 920 | 0.84% | New |
| Independent | Kelgaonkar Vithalrao Nagorao | 839 | 0.77% | New |
| Margin of victory | | 40,296 | 36.81% | ▲32.06 |
| Turnout | | 111,229 | 65.22% | ▼0.36 |
| Total valid votes | | 109,467 | | |
| Registered electors | | 170,532 | | ▲21.30 |
| INC gain from INC(I) | | Swing | ▲21.43 | |

=== Assembly Election 1980 ===
1980 Maharashtra Legislative Assembly election : Latur
| Party | Candidate | Votes | % | ±% |
|---|---|---|---|---|
| INC(I) | Vilasrao Dagadojirao Deshmukh | 38,160 | 42.15% | ▲38.28 |
| INC(U) | Nade Shivajirao Tukaram | 33,856 | 37.39% | New |
| JP | Gomare Manoharrao Eknathrao | 17,017 | 18.79% | New |
| Independent | Kashinath Amrutrao | 1,509 | 1.67% | New |
| Margin of victory | | 4,304 | 4.75% | ▲1.35 |
| Turnout | | 92,196 | 65.58% | ▼6.74 |
| Total valid votes | | 90,542 | | |
| Registered electors | | 140,583 | | ▲11.86 |
| INC(I) gain from INC | | Swing | ▼2.97 | |

=== Assembly Election 1978 ===
1978 Maharashtra Legislative Assembly election : Latur
| Party | Candidate | Votes | % | ±% |
|---|---|---|---|---|
| INC | Shivraj Vishwanath Patil | 39,809 | 45.12% | ▼19.04 |
| JP | Gomare Manoharrao Eknathrao | 36,806 | 41.72% | New |
| Independent | Lamture Annarao Bhagwanrao | 3,720 | 4.22% | New |
| PWPI | Mande Harichandra Eknathrao | 3,696 | 4.19% | New |
| INC(I) | Dongre Baburao Gunderao | 3,418 | 3.87% | New |
| Independent | Shelke Gopal Tulshiram | 771 | 0.87% | New |
| Margin of victory | | 3,003 | 3.40% | ▼30.90 |
| Turnout | | 90,891 | 72.32% | ▲8.73 |
| Total valid votes | | 88,220 | | |
| Registered electors | | 125,682 | | ▲28.05 |
| INC hold | | Swing | ▼19.04 | |

=== Assembly Election 1972 ===
1972 Maharashtra Legislative Assembly election : Latur
| Party | Candidate | Votes | % | ±% |
|---|---|---|---|---|
| INC | Shivraj Vishwanath Patil | 38,400 | 64.16% | ▲19.09 |
| SSP | Vasant Shankar Patil | 17,874 | 29.87% | New |
| RPI | Hanmant Suryavanshi | 2,009 | 3.36% | New |
| ABJS | Despande Vasant Hanmant | 1,563 | 2.61% | ▲0.99 |
| Margin of victory | | 20,526 | 34.30% | ▲26.05 |
| Turnout | | 62,415 | 63.59% | ▼8.51 |
| Total valid votes | | 59,846 | | |
| Registered electors | | 98,150 | | ▲23.13 |
| INC gain from SSP | | Swing | ▲10.85 | |

=== Assembly Election 1967 ===
1967 Maharashtra Legislative Assembly election : Latur
| Party | Candidate | Votes | % | ±% |
|---|---|---|---|---|
| SSP | V. R. Kaldate | 28,948 | 53.31% | New |
| INC | Keshavrao Sonawane | 24,470 | 45.07% | ▼12.08 |
| ABJS | B. R. Belambe | 879 | 1.62% | New |
| Margin of victory | | 4,478 | 8.25% | ▼14.10 |
| Turnout | | 57,475 | 72.10% | ▲9.81 |
| Total valid votes | | 54,297 | | |
| Registered electors | | 79,711 | | ▲16.43 |
| SSP gain from INC | | Swing | ▼3.84 | |

=== Assembly Election 1962 ===
1962 Maharashtra Legislative Assembly election : Latur
| Party | Candidate | Votes | % | ±% |
|---|---|---|---|---|
| INC | Keshavrao Sonawane | 23,049 | 57.15% | ▲2.32 |
| Independent | Ramchandra Govind | 14,036 | 34.80% | New |
| PWPI | Digamberrao Yadavrao | 2,974 | 7.37% | New |
| Independent | Yesgwanta Yatya | 270 | 0.67% | New |
| Margin of victory | | 9,013 | 22.35% | ▲12.68 |
| Turnout | | 42,649 | 62.29% | ▲13.45 |
| Total valid votes | | 40,329 | | |
| Registered electors | | 68,463 | | ▲24.02 |
| INC hold | | Swing | ▲2.32 | |

=== Assembly Election 1957 ===
1957 Bombay State Legislative Assembly election : Latur
| Party | Candidate | Votes | % | ±% |
|---|---|---|---|---|
| INC | Keshavrao Sonawane | 14,785 | 54.83% | ▼8.66 |
| Independent | Vithalrao Kelgaonkar | 12,178 | 45.17% | New |
| Margin of victory | | 2,607 | 9.67% | ▼34.73 |
| Turnout | | 26,963 | 48.84% | ▲2.50 |
| Total valid votes | | 26,963 | | |
| Registered electors | | 55,202 | | ▲5.36 |
| INC hold | | Swing | ▼8.66 | |

=== Assembly Election 1952 ===
1952 Hyderabad State Legislative Assembly election : Latur
| Party | Candidate | Votes | % | ±% |
|---|---|---|---|---|
| INC | Vinayak Rao Koratkar | 15,414 | 63.49% | New |
| SCF | Ramcharan Barma | 4,633 | 19.08% | New |
| PWPI | Baswanappa | 4,232 | 17.43% | New |
| Margin of victory | | 10,781 | 44.40% | |
| Turnout | | 24,279 | 46.34% | |
| Total valid votes | | 24,279 | | |
| Registered electors | | 52,396 | | |
| INC win (new seat) | | | | |

== See also ==
- Latur Rural Assembly constituency
- Latur City Assembly constituency
