= Diliprao Deshmukh =

Indian politician

Member Of Maharashtra Legislative Council
- In office 22 June 2000 – 21 June 2018
- Succeeded by: Suresh Dhas
- Constituency: Osmanabad-Latur-Beed Local Authorities

Minister of State for Finance and Planning
- In office 2003–2004
- Chief Minister: Sushilkumar Shinde
- Preceded by: Rajendra Darda
- Succeeded by: Sunil Deshmukh

Minister Rehabilitation and Relief Work, Sports, Youth Welfare & Protocol Government of Maharashtra
- In office 1 March 2009 – 8 December 2009
- Chief Minister: Ashok Chavan

Personal details
- Born: 18 April 1950 (age 76) Latur
- Citizenship: Indian
- Party: Indian National Congress
- Spouse: Suvarna Deshmukh
- Children: 1 daughter (Name: Gaurawi Deshmukh Bhosale)
- Parent: Dagdoji Deshmukh
- Occupation: Politician, businessman

Diliprao Dagdojirao Deshmukh (Marathi: दिलीपराव देशमुख) (born 18 April 1950) is an Indian politician, and younger brother of Vilasrao Deshmukh. He served as the Minister of State for Finance & Planning in the state of Maharashtra under Chief Minister Sushil Kumar Shinde and He served as Cabinet Minister under Ashok Chavan Government.

Deshmukh was elected to the legislative council of Maharashtra in 2000. He served as Cabinet Minister under Ashok Chavan. Prior to entering politics, Deshmukh was the vice-chairman of Maharashtra State Cooperative Bank.
