= Amit Deshmukh =

Indian politician

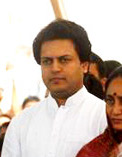
- Amit Deshmukh in 2021

Member of the Maharashtra Legislative Assembly
- Incumbent
- Assumed office 2009
- Preceded by: Vilasrao Deshmukh
- Constituency: Latur City

National Secretary of the All India Congress Committee
- Incumbent
- Assumed office 2014

Cabinet Minister Government of Maharashtra
- In office 30 December 2019 – 29 June 2022
- Governor: Bhagat Singh Koshyari
- Chief Minister: Uddhav Thackeray
- Cabinet: Thackeray ministry
- Ministry and Departments: Medical Education; Cultural Affairs
- Preceded by: Balasaheb Thorat / Subhash Desai
- Succeeded by: Eknath Shinde

Minister of State Government of Maharashtra
- In office 2 June 2014 – 26 September 2014
- Minister: Food and Drug Administration; Excise; Energy, New and Renewable Energy
- Governor: C. Vidyasagar Rao; Bhagat Singh Koshyari
- Chief Minister: Prithviraj Chavan
- Cabinet: Prithviraj Chavan ministry

Guardian minister of Latur District Government of Maharashtra
- In office 9 January 2020 – 29 June 2022
- Preceded by: Pankaja Munde
- Succeeded by: Girish Mahajan
- Constituency: Latur City

Personal details
- Born: Amit Vilasrao Deshmukh; 21 March 1976 (age 50) Latur, Maharashtra, India
- Party: Indian National Congress
- Spouse: Aditi Pratap (m. 2008)
- Children: 2
- Parent: Vilasrao Deshmukh (father)
- Relatives: See Deshmukh family
- Website: www.amitvilasraodeshmukh.com

Amit Vilasrao Deshmukh (born 21 March 1976) is an Indian politician and a member of Indian National Congress. He is the son of veteran congress leader Vilasrao Deshmukh. He is a three term Member of the Maharashtra Legislative Assembly from the Latur city constituency. He is the National Secretary of the All India Congress Committee.

== Early life ==
Deshmukh was born on 21 March 1976 to Vilasrao Deshmukh. He is also the elder brother of actor Ritesh Deshmukh and Dhiraj Deshmukh.

== Political career ==
Son of a politician, Amit Deshmukh entered the Maharashtra political scene at a young age. Working from the grassroots, he actively participated in the 1997 Latur Nagar Parishad elections at the age of 21, and was involved in the campaigning for Shivraj Patil in the 1999 Lok Sabha elections.

He has been the vice-president of the Youth Congress in the years 2002 and 2008. In 2009, Amit Deshmukh contested from Latur city on a Congress ticket and defeated Kayyum Khan Mohammad Khan Pathan of Bahujan Samaj Party, and Shripad Kulkarni of Shiv Sena by a margin of 89,480 votes. It was the fourth largest victory in Maharashtra.

In December 2019, Deshmukh took oath as a cabinet minister in the 2019 Maharashtra Legislative Assembly.

He was the guardian minister of Latur district.

== Personal life ==
He is married to actress Aditi Pratap.

== Positions held ==
- 2009 – present - Member of Legislative Assembly, Maharashtra.
- 2014 - 2014 - Minister of State, Government of Maharashtra
- 2014 – present - National Secretary of the All India Congress Committee
- 2019 – 2022 - Cabinet Minister, Government of Maharashtra

Preceded by Vilasrao Deshmukh	Member of Maharashtra Legislative Assembly from Latur City; 22 October 2009 – present	Succeeded by
Preceded by	Minister of State Tourism, Food & Drugs Administration, Excise, and New Renewable Energy, Maharashtra State; 2 June 2014 – 26 September 2014	Succeeded by
Preceded by Balasaheb Thorat / Subhash Desai	Cabinet Minister for Medical Education & Cultural Affairs, Maharashtra State; 30 December 2019 – 29 June 2022	Succeeded by Eknath Shinde
Preceded by Pankaja Munde	Maharashtra State Guardian Minister for Latur district 9 January 2019 – 29 June 2022	Succeeded by Girish Mahajan
