= Reactions to the 2008 Mumbai attacks =

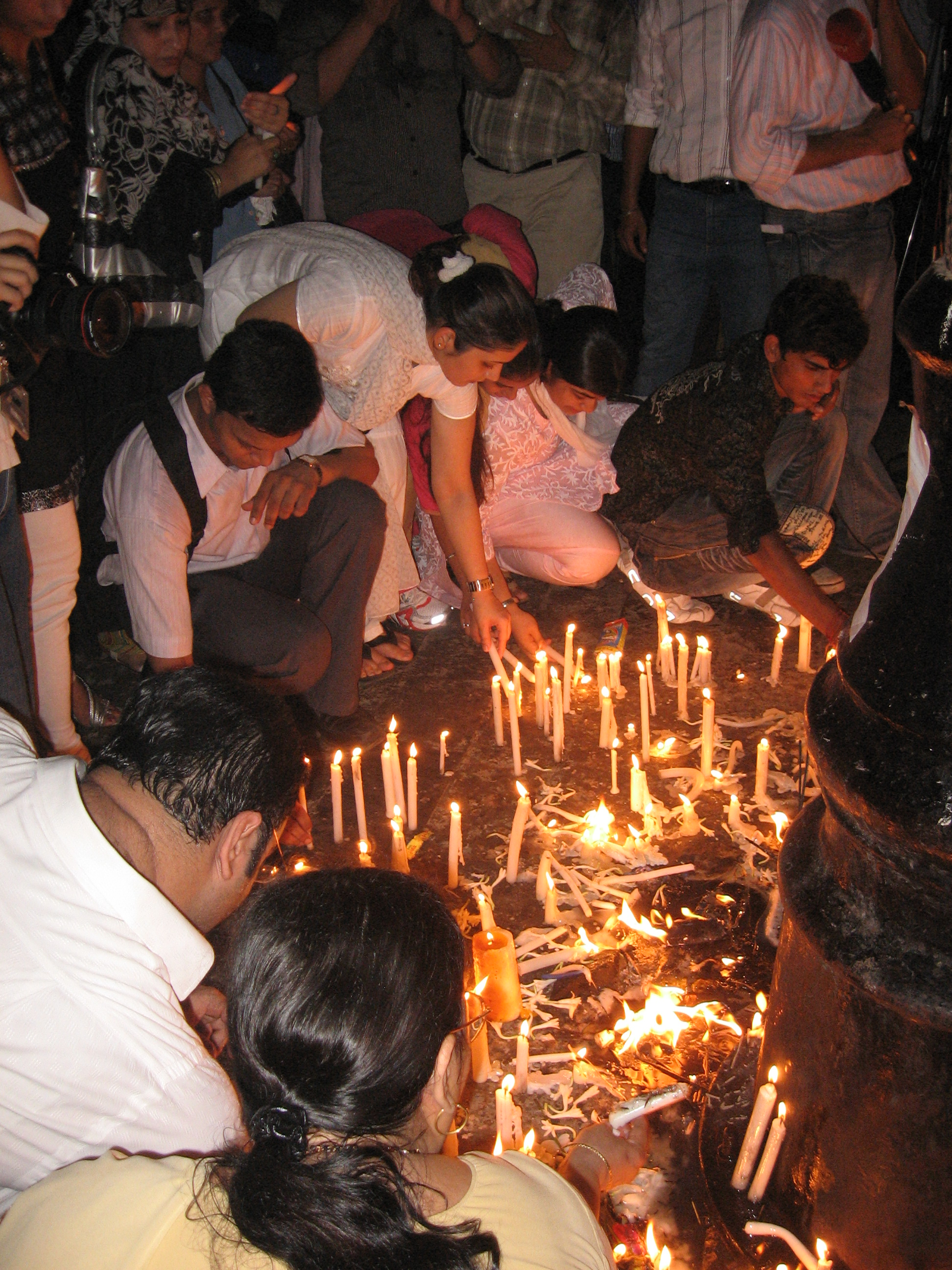
Candle light vigils were held in the following days.

Reactions to the 2008 Mumbai attacks were on the local, national and international levels. Political reactions in Mumbai and throughout India included a range of resignations and political changes. Other reactions included condemnation of the attacks by an Indian Muslim organisation and Naxalites. International reactions to the attacks was widespread, with many countries and international organisations condemning the attacks and expressing their condolences to the civilian victims. Media coverage highlighted the use of new media and internet social-networking tools (including Twitter and Flickr) in spreading information about the attacks, observing that internet coverage was often faster than more-traditional media sources.

== India ==
In a televised address Prime Minister Manmohan Singh said India would "go after" individuals and organisations behind the terrorist attacks, which were "well-planned with external linkages". In addition, the attacks were "intended to create a sense of panic by choosing high-profile targets and indiscriminately killing innocent foreigners", Singh said in a televised address to the nation. Leader of the opposition L K Advani asked the people of India to stay united during the emergency. He also said, "We will take the strongest possible measures to ensure that there is no repetition of such terrorist acts".

=== Criticism of politicians and resignations ===
Indians criticised their political leaders after the attacks, contending that their bickering and ineptitude were at least partly responsible. The Times of India noted on its front page that "Our politicians fiddle as innocents die". Anger with the political class in the wake of the Mumbai terror attacks boiled over with slain NSG commando Major Sandeep Unnikrishnan's father shoving Kerala Chief Minister V. S. Achuthanandan. Public furor was further exacerbated with Achutanandan's statement in a television interview that "if it had not been Sandeep's house, not even a dog would have gone there", which was posted online. After this became controversial the chief minister issued a written apology, stating that his remarks were misunderstood.

On 30 November Minister for Home Affairs Shivraj Patil resigned, taking moral responsibility for the security lapse. After his resignation, P. Chidambaram was made Union Minister for Home Affairs and Prime Minister Manmohan Singh took over the Finance Ministry from Chidambaram. India's National Security Advisor M. K. Narayanan also offered to resign the same day, but Singh did not accept his resignation.

Chief Minister of Maharashtra Vilasrao Deshmukh also resigned on 1 December 2008 in the aftermath of the attack and visiting the site with his son Riteish and film director Ram Gopal Varma which led to widespread condemnation, and was replaced a few days later by Ashok Chavan. On 1 December Deputy CM R. R. Patil resigned when Nationalist Congress Party (NCP) leader Sharad Pawar asked him to tender his resignation and he was replaced by Chhagan Bhujbal. Patil was under pressure to resign after commenting on the attacks that "bade bade deshon mein chhote cheez hote rehte hai" (small things happen in big countries).

2 years after the attack, UPA leader Digvijaya Singh was criticized and lambasted for attending a book launch which described that the Rashtriya Swayamsevak Sangh had conspired the attack. The book RSS ki Saazish (meaning Conspiracy by RSS), written by Aziz Burney, was extremely condemned by RSS members and opposition leaders. Furthermore, the Congress party was also slammed for coining the terms of Hindu terrorists and Saffron terror, relating to several terror attacks across the nation before the November 2008 carnage in Mumbai.

=== Criticism of rescue operation ===
NSG commandos based in Mehram Nagar, Palam Airport, Delhi took 10 hours to reach the sites. They were ready at 01:00, but had to wait three hours (until 03:15) for an aircraft to arrive from Chandigarh when the policy was that a plane be at Palam permanently. The NSG commandos landed at Mumbai Airport at 05:15, but had to wait an hour for the Bombay police to arrange BEST buses for them. They reached the Taj Mahal Hotel and the Oberoi Trident Hotel at 07:00, but initially were not given detailed maps of the buildings. The operations in the Taj Mahal hotel and Nariman House were conducted under the glare of the media, which may have assisted the terrorists by removing the element of surprise.

=== Indian Muslims ===
An Indian Muslim organisation, the Indian Muslim Council, refused to bury the nine attackers in South Mumbai's Marine Lines Bada Qabrastan (Big Graveyard). They also sent messages to other Muslim organisations in India asking them to refrain from burying them. The council said it was trying to send a message to all cemeteries in India that none of the bodies should be buried on Indian soil.

All India Organization of Imams of Mosques expressed solidarity in the aftermath of the attack.

Javed Anand, a writer and activist said, "They (attackers) claim to be doing this in the name of Islam. We have to tell them, 'Not in our name'". The organisation also conducted prayers for peace and harmony.

Many mosques in Gujarat observed silence to remember the attacks.

According to The Washington Post, many Indian Muslims held a more sombre Eid (which occurred on 9 December in 2008) out of respect for the victims of the attacks.

=== Demands for self-defense ===
The Mumbai attacks left the corporate sector of India angry; vulnerable sectors wanted to be armed. In addition, a meeting convened by the Karnataka government with industry heads led to demands from industry to be allowed to purchase automatic weapons for their private security firms and the right to bear arms.

=== Tribute to the victims ===
Naxalites (who are waging an insurgency in parts of India) gave a gun salute to the victims of Mumbai attack. According to the Times of India, this gesture marked a significant shift in their policy. On 4 December 2008, the week after the attack, a vigil was performed in Mumbai in honour of those killed. On the second anniversary of the attack, a candlelight march was held in Mumbai.

== International reactions ==
The Mumbai attacks elicited political responses from around the world, largely expressing condemnation for the acts of terrorism and condolences for the relatives of those killed.

=== International organisations ===
- Head of the Commonwealth of Nations Queen Elizabeth II issued a statement that read: "I am shocked and deeply saddened by the attacks that occurred in Mumbai. My thoughts and prayers are with the families of those who died and with those who have been injured".
- EU and France Nicolas Sarkozy, in his roles of both President of France and President of the European Council, said: "I strongly condemn the indiscriminate violence that hit your country through this series of ugly and odious terrorist acts. In this sad moment, I wish to give my sincerest condolences to the families of the innocent victims of these reprehensible attacks and express my sympathy and my wish to the injured for rapid recovery". High Representative for the Common Foreign and Security Policy Javier Solana said: "I condemn in the strongest possible terms the heinous terrorist attacks throughout the city of Mumbai. I convey my most sincere condolences to the families of the victims and my sympathy to the Indian authorities. To those who were injured, I wish a speedy recovery. These acts show once again the need for the international community to stand united against terrorism and fight it with determination".
- Organisation of the Islamic Conference – A spokesperson for the OIC expressed regret over the deaths of innocent people due to the attacks; the spokesperson conveyed heartfelt condolences to the Indian Government and the families of the victims and wished for the speedy recovery of the wounded. The spokesperson stressed that such violent acts run counter to human values and they cannot be justified.
- Secretary General Jaap de Hoop Scheffer said: "I condemn in the strongest possible terms the mindless and indiscriminate terrorist attacks in Mumbai. Attacking innocent people, tourists and patients in hospitals is despicable and cowardly. On behalf of the Alliance, I am relaying the sincerest words of solidarity and sympathy to the Indian authorities, to Indian people and especially families of the victims. NATO, as part of the international community, is determined to spare no effort to fight the scourge of terrorism which should have no place in the 21st century."
- UN Secretary-General Ban Ki-moon's spokesperson stated: "The Secretary-General condemns the rash of shootings and blasts in Mumbai today, which killed and wounded a large number of people. Such violence is totally unacceptable. The Secretary-General reiterates his conviction that no cause or grievance can justify indiscriminate attacks against civilians. He calls for the perpetrators to be brought to justice swiftly. The Secretary-General sends his deepest sympathies to the families of the victims and the wounded and expresses his solidarity with the people and Government of India.." The 15 members of the United Nation Security Council issued a statement saying, "The members of the Security Council expressed their condolences to the families of the victims and to the people and Government of India, underlined the need to bring perpetrators, organizers, financiers and sponsors of these reprehensible acts of terrorism to justice. All acts of terrorism are criminal and unjustifiable, regardless of their motivation".

=== Religious communities and organisations ===
- Anglican Communion – Archbishop of Canterbury Rowan Williams wrote to the High Commissioner of India, Shiv Shankar Mukherjee, the next day expressing his shock and outrage and offering (on behalf of the Anglican Communion) prayers for those who had lost loved ones, for the injured and for all those caring for them or dealing with the ongoing siege: "People everywhere stand in solidarity with the innocent and in condemnation of those who would destroy innocent lives out of evil and misguided motives."

=== Countries ===
==== World Support ====
- Israel – Israel offered a team of about 40 special-operations forces and assistance in investigations. Tzipi Livni said: "If they need us we will help where needed". Magen David Adom dispatched a team of paramedics, medics and other professionals to assist with rescue efforts in the wake of the attacks. Israeli newspapers reported that India turned down an offer by Defense Minister Ehud Barak to send counter-terrorist units to help fight the attackers.
- Malaysia – Malaysian authorities investigated reports related to Malaysian-issued credit cards held by the perpetrators. Malaysia will also coordinate with Interpol over reports that some of the Mumbai attackers passed themselves off as Malaysian citizens.
- United Kingdom – the United Kingdom sent 15 forensic experts from its intelligence services to Mumbai to help with the investigations on the attacks. A Scotland Yard team also investigated the attack.
- United States – President of the United States George W. Bush told Prime Minister Manmohan Singh that American agencies will "throw their weight" behind India's investigation into the Mumbai terror attacks and demonstrate a "shared commitment" to combat terrorism. The United States sent a team of agents from the Federal Bureau of Investigation (FBI) to assist in the probe into the Mumbai attacks, and American President George W. Bush pledged "full support" to India in its efforts to unearth the plot behind the deadly terror strikes. While a group of FBI agents were en route to India, a second group of investigators was on alert to join the first team if necessary. "The FBI continues to monitor the situation in Mumbai and the Counterterrorism Division is reviewing all of the information and intelligence available", bureau spokesman Richard Kolko told The Washington Post.

==== General World Reaction ====
- Afghanistan – President Hamid Karzai said: "The government and people of Afghanistan stand by India in the aftermath of this horrific and inhuman act of terror. Nothing is more heinous and deplorable than taking the lives of innocent people in such a cowardly attack on public places. [...] Terrorism is a threat to us all, affecting India, Afghanistan and the region. Responding to this threat requires nothing less than a joint strategy to defeat this menace".
- Albania – A statement was published on 26 November: "The Ministry of Foreign Affairs of the Republic of Albania condemns vehemently the unprecedented terrorist act perpetrated today in Mumbai, India, claiming hundreds of innocent human lives and hundreds of others injured. It extends its full solidarity to the Indian authorities and the deepest condolences to the families of the victims caused by this barbarous act."
- Argentina – The Foreign Ministry expressed its condemnation and its "total solidarity with the people and government" of India. A communiqué also read that "the Argentine authority requested the Indian government to transmit its sorrow to the relatives of the victims".
- Armenia – Speaker of the National Assembly Hovik Abrahamyan expressed condolences on the occasion of the attacks in Mumbai to Speaker of the Rajya Sabha and Vice President of India Mohammad Hamid Ansari and Speaker of the Lok Sabha Somnath Chatterjee: "We learned with grief about the tragedy in Mumbai, and about hundreds of killed and injured innocent people. I express my deepest condolences on behalf of the National Assembly of the Republic of Armenia and personally on my behalf to you, members of the Parliament, families of those killed and wish speedy recovery to the injured. We always condemned and condemn the terrorism. We are sure that the organisers and executors of this unprecedented crime will get their condign punishment".
- Australia – Prime Minister Kevin Rudd said that his government "unreservedly condemned these atrocious attacks" and added: "We are deeply concerned by these developments, deeply concerned by the potential impact on Indian citizens and other citizens, and we will have further to say about this during the course of the day".
- Bangladesh – Foreign Minister Iftekhar Ahmed Chowdhury said in a statement: "We strongly condemned what's happened in Mumbai. These are acts of terrorism, and terrorism serves no purpose. Many innocent people have suffered, many have been killed, others injured and we send them our condolences".
- Bosnia and Herzegovina – Chairman of the Presidency Nebojša Radmanović sent a letter of condolence to Indian President Pratibha Patil, saying "Brutal and gratuitous terrorist attack in Mumbai represents an attack on all the values of modern world: human lives, peace, freedom. It is responsibility of all of us who share those values to strengthen our forces against that evil. Such a terrible attack on civilians deserves harsh condemnation on the part of civilised world and there is no excuse for these crimes. I would kindly ask you to inform your citizens in this hard moment that peoples and citizens of Bosnia and Herzegovina sympathise with them".
- Brazil – The Foreign Ministry issued a communiqué that "the Brazilian government received with deep sorrow the news on 26 Nov., of terrorist attacks in Mumbai, where tens of people died". "Brazil transmits its condolences to the relatives of the victims and the Indian government", the communique added.
- Bulgaria – In a public telegram on 27 November, Minister of Foreign Affairs Ivaylo Kalfin presented his deepest condolences to his Indian colleague and said, "We categorically condemn those barbaric acts of terrorism that cannot be justified by any sort of political, ethnic or religious reasons, and we express our support for stronger co-operation of the international community in the struggle against terrorism".
- Canada – Foreign Minister Lawrence Cannon stated: "Canada strongly condemns the savage terrorist attacks in Mumbai, which have left hundreds of innocent civilians injured or killed...these cowardly attacks are truly appalling". Cannon confirmed that two Canadians were killed in the attack on the Taj Mahal Hotel, and offered his sympathies to their families.
  - Residents of Toronto's Little India neighbourhood expressed shock and disgust at the news.
- Chile – The Ministry of Foreign Affairs issued a statement that read: "The Government of Chile vows for the prompt identification, capture and taken up to justice of all perpetrators, and calls to stretch international cooperation with the Indian government, with this purpose. The use of innocent people as human shields, hostages or victims of the attacks in Mumbai, have no justification at all, because those actions attempt against human security and constitute crimes against humanity".
- China – Premier Wen Jiabao said the Chinese government "strongly condemned" the attacks and that China is "firmly opposed to terrorism of any form". The Xinhua reported: "On behalf of the Chinese government and himself, Wen expressed deep grief for the victims of the attacks and conveyed sincere condolences to the relatives of the victims and those wounded in the violence". Foreign Ministry spokesman Qin Gang said at a press briefing that the Chinese people offered their deepest condolences to those who died.
  - Hong Kong – A spokesman for the Security Bureau advised on 27 November that Hong Kong residents avoid unnecessary travel to India, and those who were already in India should attend to their personal safety and keep themselves abreast of the situation there. On the same day Secretary for Security Ambrose Lee, while visiting Tokyo, said the attacks clearly show the importance of close co-operation among law enforcement agencies around the world in the fight against international terrorism.
- Colombia – In a press release, the Colombian government said it "regrets and condemns" the attacks. Since Colombia "has also suffered the effects of terrorism", it joined India in its struggle against this "international scourge". It also voiced its support for the Indian government and its solidarity with the victims and their families.
- Cyprus – The Foreign Ministry expressed in a statement "the sympathy and the deepest and sincere condolences on behalf of the government and the Cypriot people to the government of India, the Indian people and the families of the victims". "At these difficult times for India," the statement continued, "the Republic of Cyprus expresses its solidarity and support to the struggle of the government of India to eliminate international terrorism and notes the need for a more active engagement of the international community in the campaign against terrorism".
- Czech Republic – The Ministry of Foreign Affairs issued a statement that read it "vigorously condemns the series of attacks done 26 November in Mumbai, and expresses condolences to the families of the victims. The Ministry of Foreign Affairs believes that the perpeatrors of this bloody and unfair act will be captured and judged according to law. Simultaneously expresses its support to India in the fight against terrorism".
- Denmark – At a press conference in Belgrade, Serbia, Prime Minister Anders Fogh Rasmussen stated that "I condemn in the strongest possible terms the cowardly and despicable terrorist act, that has killed many people, injured several others and taken other people as hostage". He also said that the Danish government's thoughts goes to the victims and relatives, as well as those still being held as hostages. Foreign Minister Per Stig Møller also condemned the attacks, saying that they were aimed against Westerners using a well-known strategy used in other terrorist attacks.
- Estonia – The Ministry of Foreign Affairs issued a statement condemning the attacks. "The deaths of innocent people as a result of shootings and bombings once again demonstrate the inhumanity of terrorism", said Foreign Minister Urmas Paet. There is absolutely no justification for terrorism, he emphasised. Estonia harshly condemns all types of terrorism and participates along with other nations in the unified fight against terrorism.
- Ethiopia – President Girma Woldegiorgis and senior Ethiopian government officials sent messages of condolence to their Indian counterparts over the tragedy in Mumbai due to the attacks. The President, Prime Minister Meles Zenawi and Foreign Affairs Minister Seyoum Mesfin expressed heartfelt sorrow over the death of innocent civilians following the acts of terrorists. Girma expressed sympathy and condolence (through Indian President Pratibha Patil) to the victims and their families and reiterated his belief that the Indian government and its people would overcome the situation. Prime Minister Meles reiterated to Manmohan Singh that "We (the world) is witnessing how serious is the danger we all are facing from those who care little for the innocent and who are prepared to resort to the worst form of barbarity to promote their objective. We condemn these barbaric acts and extend sympathy to the people of India". Similarly, Seyoum Mesfin expressed sorrow over the death of innocent civilians and damage to property. He also expressed (through his Indian counterpart) sympathy to the Indian people and bereaved families.
- Finland – The Ministry for Foreign Affairs published a statement on its website: "The government of India deserves our clear support in the prevention of terrorism and calming down the situation," Foreign Minister Alexander Stubb said. "The strike in Mumbai showed, once again, that terrorism knows no frontiers. International cooperation against terrorism is even more important today".
- Germany – Chancellor Angela Merkel wrote to India: "I was appalled to hear the shocking news about the terror attacks on your country. As well as the sad fate of the many dead I'm particularly moved by the terrible situation of those who've been taken hostage. The Federal Republic strongly condemns these criminal acts. I would like to express my deepest sympathy to you and the people of your country. In this difficult hour our thoughts are with the victims and their loved ones. I wish the injured from the bottom of my heart a quick recovery."
- Greece – Hellenic Foreign Affairs Minister Dora Bakoyanni stated, "We express our outrage at the terrorist attacks in India and condemn any act of violence against citizens and democracy".
- Holy See – On 27 November, Vatican spokesman Federico Lombardi said that the "frightening and dramatic" attacks offended "the entire international community". Later the same day, Pope Benedict XVI condemned the "brutal attacks" in Mumbai. He also asked Archbishop of Bombay Oswald Gracias to "kindly convey his heartfelt condolences to the families of those who have lost their lives in these brutal attacks, and to assure the public authorities, citizens and all those affected of his spiritual closeness. His Holiness urgently appeals for an end to all acts of terrorism, which gravely offend the human family and severely destabilise the peace and solidarity needed to build a civilisation worthy of mankind's noble vocation to love God and neighbour".
- Indonesia – The Foreign Ministry issues a statement that read: "The government of Indonesia strongly condemns the terrorist attacks in Mumbai, India. The terrorist attacks are cruel and inhumane acts. The government of Indonesia conveys its deepest condolences to the government of India and the victims along with their families, and hopes that the perpetrators could be swiftly arrested and be brought to justice."
- Iran – President Mahmoud Ahmadinejad condemned the attacks, saying that they aim at destabilising the region and adding, "I am sure that the sinister phenomenon [terrorism] cannot hinder the development of the nations of the region". He also sympathised with those Indian families who lost their loved ones in the attacks. Foreign Ministry spokesman Hassan Qashqavi said: "Iran is also a victim of terrorist attacks and is ready to fight against such evil acts on all levels". He also expressed the sympathy of the Iranian people and government with the Indian nation and the families of the victims.
- Ireland – Minister for Foreign Affairs Micheál Martin stated: "I wish to condemn in the strongest terms these appalling terrorist attacks in Mumbai and to convey my deepest sympathy to the Indian people", adding that "Relations between India and Ireland have always been close and I wanted to assure him (Ambassador P. S. Raghavan) of our sympathy and prayers. As we in Ireland know all too well terrorist atrocities such as these serve no purpose except to kill and injure innocent victims, Indian and foreign alike, and to sow panic and suspicion".
- Italy – President Giorgio Napolitano was said to be following the events with concern for the Italian people involved. Minister of Foreign Affairs Franco Frattini condemned the attacks and defined them as "atrocious and unjustifiable".
- Israel – Interim Prime Minister Ehud Olmert praised the Indian government and military, stating that "At no stage were the issues of whether or not Israel should join the operation, or do things that were within the power of the Indian government and its strong and trained military to do alone, on the agenda. I am very pleased at the cooperation and would like to take this opportunity to thank the Indian government for seeing fit to update us throughout the events". Foreign Minister Tzipi Livni said: "I condemn the terror attack that is still ongoing in Mumbai; it is another painful testimony that terrorism is the main challenge that Israel and the international community are dealing with". She added, "Israel, India and the rest of the free world are positioned in the forefront of the battle against terrorism and extremists. Unfortunately, we were harshly reminded of this once again yesterday. The struggle against terror must be a communal struggle, and compels us to improve our cooperation on this front".
- Japan – Prime Minister Taro Aso said: "This kind of terrorism is unforgivable, extremely despicable and vicious. I feel strong resentment and deeply condemn it. Japan is with the Indian people who are fighting against terrorism and we will cooperate with the Indian government".
- Jordan – "Allow me also, on behalf of His Majesty King Abdullah Bin Al Hussein and the Government and people of Jordan, to present our sincere condolences to the people of India for the terrible suffering that they have endured after the reprehensible terrorist attacks in Mumbai. We condemn these despicable acts in the strongest terms. We express our deep sympathy to the bereaved families of the victims and reiterate our solidarity with these families during this trying time."
- Kuwait – The government "strongly condemned" the attacks.
- Latvia – Minister for Foreign Affairs Maris Riekstins expressed his sympathy to the people of India regarding the attacks. Riekstins sent a letter to Minister of External Affairs Pranab Mukherjee, strongly condemning the attacks of terrorism on the civilian population and conveying condolences to the families of the victims of the attacks.
- Mauritius – Minister Arvin Boolell said that the whole world was horrified by the events. He also reiterated his support and solidarity with India and spoke of his condemnation of such acts. "The Government of Mauritius condemns forcefully the cowardly terrorist attacks that occurred in Mumbai last night."
- Malaysia – The Ministry of Foreign Affairs issued a statement saying: "The Government of Malaysia condemns in the strongest terms the horrific terrorist attacks on a number of major public places at the heart of Mumbai. It is our hope that the perpetrators of these heinous and despicable crimes would be expeditiously brought to justice".
- Mexico – The Mexican government regretted the loss of lives in a communiqué which also condemned the attacks against foreigners.
- North Korea – Kim Yong Nam, former President of the Presidium of the Supreme People's Assembly of North Korea, expressed deep condolences for the victims of the attacks in Mumbai and their families.
- Norway – Prime Minister Jens Stoltenberg stated: "The Norwegian government condemns in the strongest possible terms the terrorist attacks that has taken place in Mumbai, India, and our thoughts goes to all those affected and their relatives. We denounce this type of terrorist attacks. We have already sent a message from the Norwegian government, and I have as well sent a personal message to Prime Minister Singh with a personal message, in which we express our condolences and sympathies with the Indian people. We express our support to the work the Indian government now does to help the injured, what has happened and apprehend those responsible for the terrorist attack".
- Pakistan – Prime Minister Yousuf Raza Gilani condemned the attacks, saying "our grievances are with the families and friends of those killed and injured while carrying out the attack. Pakistan and India will continue their joint struggles to counter the actions of terrorists". A statement on behalf of Foreign Minister Makhdoom Shah Mehmood Qureshi also condemned the attacks, saying: "Terrorism is a menace threatening humanity and humanity should join hands in fighting this scourge. Pakistan condemns terrorism in all its forms and manifestations. Pakistan itself has suffered because of terrorism and sacrificed much in fighting this threat. We also express deep condolences to the bereaved families".
- Panama – Panama expressed its condemnation and said that "the violent and furious actions that have produced so much mourning and pain in that country (India) have touched global public opinion and aroused the highest expression of solidarity".
- Philippines- Deputy Spokesperson Anthony Golez issued a statement that read: "We condemn these terroristic attacks against mankind and we will be united with the entire Indian nation and the rest of the world in its quest to end terrorism the soonest possible time". No Filipino nationals were attacked in Mumbai, according to the Department of Foreign Affairs.
- Poland – President Kaczynski condemned the "acts of barbarity" and expressed "solidarity with the victims. The Mumbai terrorist attacks show that the fight with terrorism is necessary. These acts of terrorism show that the problem exists, that it is not easy to solve and that the fight with it is justified, even if some mistakes have been made." Sikorski said: "We are indignant at the terrorist attack in India. We are condemning what has happened there in the strongest possible words."
- Russia – President Dmitry Medvedev said: "We are concerned about the loss of life and consider that acts of terrorism of this type are harmful to the whole international order and are a challenge to humanity". He added: "The monstrous crimes of terrorists in Mumbai arouse our wrath, indignation and unconditional condemnation. The inhuman terrorist attacks on hospitals, hotels and other public places aimed at killing peaceful civilians, taking and murdering hostages are crimes directed against the very basis of civilised society. Those guilty of them should be severely punished. We support resolute actions of the Indian government to cut short terrorist actions. I would like to pass my deepest condolences to relatives and friends of those killed and wish the swiftest possible recovery to those injured".
- Saudi Arabia – The Saudi Press Agency quoted an unnamed official as saying: "The Kingdom of Saudi Arabia strongly condemns and denounces this criminal act, and offers condolences and sympathy to the friendly government and people of India".
- Singapore – In a press release, the Ministry of Foreign Affairs said that "Singapore strongly condemns the attacks. We would like to convey our deepest condolences to the victims, their families, the Government of India and its people. The Mumbai attacks underscore the common terrorist threat that we continue to face today. Singapore stands firmly behind the Indian Government in its fight against terrorism". Later, in a letter to his Indian counterpart, Manmohan Singh, Prime Minister Lee Hsien Loong said: "I was shocked to learn of the series of terrorist attacks in Mumbai on 26 November 2008. On behalf of the government of Singapore I convey our deepest condolences to you, the Government of India and the families of the victims. The terrorists have taken several people of different nationalities as hostages, including a Singaporean. We are already working closely with the Indian authorities on this. Singapore stands ready to assist the Indian authorities in any way to secure the safe release of the Singaporean and other hostages. I am confident that the Indian people will rally around your government as it deals with the Mumbai terrorist attacks and bring the perpetrators to justice. The Mumbai attacks are another reminder that terrorism continues to be a common threat to all of us. We strongly support your government's efforts in fighting the scourge of terrorism".
- Sweden – Foreign Minister Carl Bildt condemned the attacks in a press release that read: "There is every reason to strongly condemn the large-scale terrorist attacks in Mumbai in India. India is the world's most populous democracy with an impressive history of rich coexistence between different cultures and traditions. Its democratic stability is in the interest of the whole world. We express our sympathies for all those affected, and give our strong support to the government of India in its important fight against this terrorism".
- Spain – Prime Minister José Luis Rodríguez Zapatero send a cable to his Indian counterpart that read: "The Spanish people and government strongly condemn the barbarian attacks perpetrated against innocent lives in Mumbai and express their sympathy, solidarity and affection to the Indian people with whom they will stand side by side." Spain offered its cooperation in intelligence affairs and expressed thanks to the Indian police for safeguarding the lives of a Spanish delegation headed by Madrid Region President Esperanza Aguirre, who escaped from the Oberoi Hotel when the attacks began.
- South Africa – Said: "The South African government extends its condolences to the government and people of India following a spate of attacks on a number of hotels, hospital and a restaurant in Mumbai on Wednesday, 26 November, which left a number of people dead and wounded while others have been taken hostage".
- South Korea – Foreign Ministry spokesman Moon Tae-young said: "The South Korean government denounces terrorism as a crime against civilisation and against mankind that can be never tolerated."
- Sri Lanka – President Mahinda Rajapaksa said: "My government and I hasten to condemn most vehemently the brutal acts of terrorism that killed more than 100 persons and injured many more in the attacks carried out in the Indian city of Mumbai last night. Our thoughts to go out to the families of those killed and injured and in these acts of terror; we express our deepest sympathies to the families of the deceased and wish a speedy recovery to those injured and the safe and early release of hostages. The attacks on leading hotels, hospitals and public transport in Mumbai, the business and financial capital of India, show that the terrorists are targeting an important sector of the Indian economy, with a view (to) destabilising democracy in India".
- Syria – Syria expressed condolences to victims, although the statement quickly steered off the course to criticism of Israel for its violations and crime in the region. Amit Terrorism and Intelligence Research Institute in Israel noted the antisemitism language of Syrian state media and a Qatari media.
- Timor Leste – Nobel Peace Prize Laureate and President José Ramos-Horta condemned the attacks and called for the world to fight "terrorism" together. "This cowardly attack on innocent civilians, deliberately targeting American and British citizens, must be condemned by all and must rally all countries to pursue the fight against terrorism even more relentlessly." He also underlined the significance of the attack in light of the victory of Barack Obama in the U.S. election and said that "terrorists are not interested in seeking dialogue and peaceful means to resolve whatever differences they might have with the West. It is self-evident that whoever is in the White House in the United States, terrorism will not stop."
- Tunisia – President Zine al-Abidine Ben Ali condemned the attacks, according to TAP news agency reported.
- Turkey – President Abdullah Gul added. "Turkey, as a country that wishes to strengthen relations with India in the fight against terror, shares the pain of the friendly Indian people". Prime Minister Recep Tayyip Erdogan said: "The attacks in Mumbai once again showed that terror has no religion, nationality and country." The ministry issued a statement that read: "Turkey stands together with the Republic of India and the Indian nation against the trouble of terrorism which is the enemy of all mankind and it shares their sorrow and anger. Terrorism is a crime against humanity. An effective fight against terrorism is possible only by the help of international cooperation and solidarity."
- United Kingdom – In a press release from his office, Prime Minister Gordon Brown condemned the attacks in saying: "I think I speak for the whole world – shock and outrage at the tragic destruction of innocent lives. I have already sent my sympathy and support to Prime Minister Singh of India and to say we will do everything we can to help the Indian government. Our first duty is towards British citizens caught up in this terror in Mumbai. The High Commissioner has come from Delhi to visit all those who are injured – he's visiting them now. It is too early to say any numbers for the numbers of people who are injured – we will give that during the course of the day – what I can assure you is we are doing everything within our power. We've set up a crisis centre in the foreign office where British citizens can phone in, just visit it and talk to them – they've had 800 calls already. And at the same time, we're in touch with many people who are caught up in the hotels and giving advice on what they can do. Our second responsibility is obviously to root out terrorism – to help the Indian government with their action – and that's why at the same time as giving support to the Indian prime minister, we're sending police emergency teams that are well versed in Indian terrorism and we will try to give what support we can through British police and security officials to the Indian government at this time". Foreign Secretary David Miliband also condemned the attacks, characterising them as "an attack on all of us, not just India".
- United States – President George W. Bush said: "We pledge the full support of the United States as India investigates these attacks, brings the guilty to justice and sustains its democratic way of life. The killers who struck this week are brutal and violent, but terror will not have the final word. As the people of the world's largest democracy recover from these attacks, they can count on the world's oldest democracy to stand by their side". The State Department issued a statement that condemned the attacks and stated that, at the time, there were no reports of its citizens being victims. Spokesman Robert Wood said: "We strongly condemn the terrorist attacks that have taken place in Mumbai, India. Our sympathies go out to the families and friends of those killed and injured, and to the people of Mumbai. We are monitoring the situation very closely and stand ready to support the Indian authorities as they deal with this horrific series of attacks". White House spokesman Tony Fratto also condemned the attacks. On 8 December 2008, Chairman of the U.S. Joint Chiefs of Staff Admiral Mike Mullen stated in a speech to the Jewish Institute for National Security Affairs that the attacks "crossed a new threshold" and that "their level of tactical sophistication, with GPS and BlackBerrys and satellite phones, matches only the indiscriminate nature of death and destruction they caused – and yet they intended far worse. We are working to prevent 26 November from becoming a tipping point toward chaos in the region by confronting once again a common enemy". He also said that the images of Moshe Holtzberg soon after his parents were "mercilessly struck down in Chabad House should not ever leave us".
  - President-elect Barack Obama said: "These terrorists who targeted innocent civilians will not defeat India's great democracy, nor shake the will of a global coalition to defeat them. The United States must stand with India and all nations and people who are committed to destroying terrorist networks, and defeating their hate-filled ideology".
- Uruguay – The Uruguayan government condemned the attacks and expressed its solidarity with the victims and their relatives in a communique.
- Venezuela – The Foreign Ministry issued a communiqué that read it expressesits solidarity with the Indian government over the situation and "offers its condolences to the relatives of the victims".
- Vietnam – On 27 November, Ministry of Foreign Affairs spokesman Lê Dũng said: "We are furious over an attack of terrorism causing great casualty occurred in Mumbai, India last night. We oppose and condemn all terrorist activities in any form. The leader in the terrorist attacks should soon be found and must be punished properly. We sincerely share this great loss in India. We believe that these terrorist actions which are threatening the stability of the whole world are also a major challenge for humanity".

== Travel ==
Many international airlines temporarily discontinued operations to Mumbai amid fears for passenger safety. Delta Air Lines aided employees stranded in Mumbai, working to evacuate them. Several Western countries (including the US, the UK, Australia, France and Canada) advised their citizens to defer travel to Mumbai for the short term (48–72 hours).

== Media coverage ==
The attacks showcased the increased use of social media and citizen journalism in the way events were reported. Many people discussed the unfolding event on websites such as Twitter and Flickr, which were largely clustered under search tags such as "mumbai" and "attack". The day after the attacks, however, the Indian government asked Mumbai citizens to cease updating Twitter with live coverage of police activity. The New York Times and the BBC offered live text coverage online, as did many Indian bloggers. A map of the attacks was also set up, using Google Maps. The attacks were dubbed by some journalists (and Hillary Clinton) as "India's 9/11", a reference to the 2001 11 September attacks in the United States.

A few days after the attacks the Indian news channel CNN-IBN re-aired a programme called Operation Water Rat, which they had initially aired in February 2006 and which revealed lapses in Indian maritime security. The reporters smuggled crates of apples into Mumbai three times from international waters, by landing their cargo on different beaches nearby.
