= Vilasrao Deshmukh =

Indian politician (1945–2012)

- Deshmukh in May 2012

Union Minister of Science and Technology
- In office 12 July 2011 – 14 August 2012
- Prime Minister: Manmohan Singh
- Preceded by: Pawan Kumar Bansal
- Succeeded by: Vayalar Ravi

Union Minister of Earth Sciences
- In office 12 July 2011 – 14 August 2012
- Prime Minister: Manmohan Singh
- Preceded by: Pawan Kumar Bansal
- Succeeded by: Vayalar Ravi

Union Minister of Micro, Small and Medium Enterprises
- In office 26 June 2012 – 14 August 2012
- Prime Minister: Manmohan Singh
- Preceded by: Virbhadra Singh
- Succeeded by: Vayalar Ravi

Union Minister of Rural Development
- In office 19 January 2011 – 12 July 2011
- Prime Minister: Manmohan Singh
- Preceded by: C. P. Joshi
- Succeeded by: Jairam Ramesh

Union Minister of Panchayati Raj
- In office 19 January 2011 – 12 July 2011
- Prime Minister: Manmohan Singh
- Preceded by: C. P. Joshi
- Succeeded by: Kishore Chandra Deo

Union Minister of Heavy Industries and Public Enterprises
- In office 28 May 2009 – 28 May 2012
- Prime Minister: Manmohan Singh
- Preceded by: Santosh Mohan Dev
- Succeeded by: Praful Patel

14th Chief Minister of Maharashtra
- In office 1 November 2004 – 5 December 2008
- Preceded by: Sushilkumar Shinde
- Succeeded by: Ashok Chavan
- In office 18 October 1999 – 16 January 2003
- Preceded by: Narayan Rane
- Succeeded by: Sushilkumar Shinde

Member of Maharashtra Legislative Assembly
- In office 1980–1995
- Preceded by: Shivraj Patil Chakurkar
- Succeeded by: Shivajirao Patil Kavhekar
- Constituency: Latur
- In office 1999–2009
- Preceded by: Shivajirao Patil Kavhekar
- Succeeded by: Amit Deshmukh
- Constituency: Latur

Member of Parliament, Rajya Sabha
- In office 4 August 2009 – 14 August 2012
- Preceded by: Sushilkumar Shinde
- Succeeded by: Rajani Ashokrao Patil
- Constituency: Maharashtra

Personal details
- Born: Vilasrao Dagadojirao Deshmukh; 26 May 1945 Babhalgaon, Osmanabad district, Hyderabad State, British India (present-day Maharashtra, India)
- Died: 14 August 2012 (aged 67) Chennai, Tamil Nadu, India
- Party: Indian National Congress
- Spouse: Vaishali Deshmukh (m. 1973)
- Children: Amit Deshmukh; Riteish Deshmukh; Dhiraj Deshmukh
- Relatives: Deshmukh family
- Education: LLB
- Alma mater: ILS Law College, Pune Pune University
- Profession: Lawyer

Vilasrao Dagadojirao Deshmukh (26 May 1945 – 14 August 2012) was an Indian politician who served as the 14th Chief Minister of Maharashtra, first term from 18 October 1999 to 16 January 2003 and second term, from 1 November 2004 to 5 December 2008. He also served in the Union cabinet as the Minister of Science and Technology and Minister of Earth Sciences.

Deshmukh was a Member of Parliament in Rajya Sabha, India. He had previously held the posts of Minister of Rural Development and Minister of Panchayati Raj, Government of India and Minister of Heavy Industries and Public Enterprises, Government of India. He was a member of Rajya Sabha representing Maharashtra. Vilasrao Deshmukh was two-time Chief Minister of Maharashtra, from 1999 to 2003 and from 2004 to 2008. He was a member of the Indian National Congress and originally belonged to Latur district in the Marathwada region of Maharashtra.

Critically ill with kidney and liver failures, Deshmukh died on 14 August 2012 due to multiple organ failure at Global Hospitals, Chennai. One of his sons Riteish Deshmukh is a well-known Bollywood actor.

== Personal life ==
Deshmukh was born on 26 May 1945 in Babhalgaon village in Latur district in the present-day Maharashtra. He was the eldest son of Dagdojirao Deshmukh and Sushiladevi. He had two younger sisters 'Nalini', 'Vijaya' and one younger brother 'Diliprao Deshmukh'.

His grandfather Venkatrao Deshmukh was a revenue officer in Hyderabad State and held Deshmukhi rights to collect revenues and establishing law and order in jurisdiction.

Deshmukh's father Dagdojirao got hereditary rights after his grandfather, but were of less significance than the grandfather due to merge of Hyderabad state into Dominion of India. But he was a village head in of his native village which was then in Osmanabad district. He died on turn of 2000.

His mother Sushila Devi died earlier than his father, many of Vilasrao's institutes are named after her. His younger brother Diliprao Deshmukh was member of Maharashtra legislative council and also minister in Government of Maharashtra during 2000–2018.

After completing his school education in native Latur city, he went to ILS Law College, Pune and thereafter to Pune University to study law. After passing out from the university, he began to practice law. He met his close-friend and future minister Gopinath Munde during this time, even though they represented two rival political parties, their friendship was well-known and often quoted in political circles.

He married Vaishali in 1973 and has three sons – Amit Deshmukh, a MLA in Maharashtra, Dheeraj Deshmukh a MLA and Bollywood actor Riteish Deshmukh. His three daughters in law include- Aditi Pratap, a television actress, Genelia D'Souza, a Bollywood actress and Deepshikha Deshmukh, a movie director.

== Political career ==
Deshmukh entered active politics and became a member of the Babhalgaon (Latur) Village Panchayat from 1974 to 1980 and its Sarpanch (village chief) from 1974 to 1976. He was a member of Osmanabad Zilla Parishad and Deputy Chairman of Latur Taluka Panchayat Samiti (Latur District Panchayat Committee) from 1974 to 1980. As the President of Osmanabad District Youth Congress from 1975 to 1978, he worked for the implementation of the Sanjay Gandhi inspired Five Point Programme of the Youth Congress. He organised the youth in Osmanabad district and became the President of District wing of the Congress (I) party.

He was a Member of the Maharashtra Legislative Assembly from 1980 to 1995 winning the 1980, 1985, and 1990 elections. During this period, he served as the Minister of State and the Cabinet Minister and had the portfolios of the ministries of Home, General Administration, Cooperation, Public Works, Transport, Legislative Affairs, Tourism, Agriculture, Animal Husbandry, Dairy Development Fisheries, Industry, Rural Development, Education, Technical Education, Sports and Youth Welfare.

He lost the election in 1995 by a margin of 35,000. He was re-elected to the State Legislature from Latur Constituency in the elections held in September 1999 with a strong comeback winning by a margin of nearly 91,000 in two successive elections, the highest in Maharashtra. He was sworn in as Chief Minister of Maharashtra on 18 October 1999 and served until he stepped down from the post on 17 January 2003, as a result of factionalism in the state unit of the party and succeeded by Sushilkumar Shinde.

He was re-elected to the Legislative Assembly from Latur Constituency in October 2004. He became Chief Minister for the second time on 1 November 2004 – 4 December 2008.

He subsequently entered the Rajya Sabha and was appointed to the Council of Ministers as Union Minister for Heavy Industries and Public Enterprises by Prime Minister Manmohan Singh on 28 May 2009. He was appointed Minister of Heavy Industries and Public Enterprises on 19 January 2011 after a cabinet reshuffle. Later on he was appointed Minister of Rural Development. He was appointed Minister of Science and Technology and Minister of Earth Sciences on 12 July 2011.

== Scams and controversies ==
=== 26/11 attacks controversy and resignation ===
In the aftermath of the 2008 Mumbai attacks, Public opinion forced Deshmukh, and his deputy, the state home minister, R. R. Patil, to resign for being perceived as inept administrators and insensitive to the problems facing people in the state. He took the moral responsibility and offered to resign, which was then accepted by the party.

=== Adarsh allegations ===
An affidavit filed in the Bombay High Court on 27 April 2012 alleged that Deshmukh might be owning two flats through proxies in the Adarsh housing society in Mumbai. The case is pending for further investigation. Union Minister of Power Sushil Kumar Shinde, on 25 June 2012, told a judicial panel the decision to allot government land and grant of additional Floor Space Index to the housing society was taken during Deshmukh's tenure as the Chief Minister of Maharashtra.

== Involvement with education trusts ==
Deshmukh founded the Manjra Charitable Trust which runs a number of colleges in Latur & Mumbai. Some of them are Manajara Ayurvedic Medical College & Hospital Latur, Abhinav College Latur, VDF polytechnique, VDF pharmacy college, VDF engineering college, Goldcrest high ICSE school, Rajiv Gandhi Institute of Technology at Versova, Andheri in Mumbai and Sushiladevi Deshmukh Vidyalaya at Latur & Airoli, Navi Mumbai. He also founded Marathwada Mitramandal under which there are two engineering colleges and one commerce college in Pune, and another one in Marathwada Mitra Mandal's Institute of Technology Lohegaon, Pune.

== Illness and death ==
Deshmukh was diagnosed with cirrhosis in summer 2011. Hints of his ailments, though kept private, included the writing of his will and a general lack of previous warmth and tiredness at the weddings of his two sons, Riteish and Dhiraj. He was admitted to Mumbai's Breach Candy Hospital in the first week of August 2012, where he was diagnosed with liver and kidney failure. He was flown to Chennai for a liver transplant by air ambulance on 6 August. Attempts to commence the liver transplant failed as a clinically dead man, whose liver and kidney were to be transplanted into Deshmukh, died the night before the operation. He died the following day on 14 August at 14:00 due to an apparent multiple organ failure. He died in the presence of his family.

Reactions included then-INC president Sonia Gandhi who said that his death "was a great loss to the party." President Pranab Mukherjee paid tribute and expressed grief, as did Prime Minister Manmohan Singh, who called Deshmukh "a trusted colleague and an able administrator who worked at panchayat, state and central levels with admirable dedication." Maharashtra BJP opposition leader Prakash Javadekar reacted in saying: "It is a very sad news. He was warm-hearted and cheerful and always ready for helping (others). He had a vision for Maharashtra and was equally concerned about farmers and youngsters." Minister of State for Science and Technology Ashwani Kumar called Deshmukh a "great human being" who had an ability to connect with people and that he was "very unwell. We were hoping for his recovery. I am saddened, shocked." Samajwadi Party MP Jaya Bachchan said his death was "very unfortunate to lose such a promising leader at a young age." Janata Dal United (JDU) leader Sharad Yadav said his death resulted in a "lot of pain," while Nationalist Congress Party leader Praful Patel said: "He had a long journey in public life. He was a big leader, a wise leader. He knew all parts of Maharashtra very well. It is great loss for the country and big loss for Maharashtra."

Other condolences came from Maharashtra Governor K. Sankaranarayanan, Chief Minister Prithviraj Chavan, Deputy Chief Minister Ajit Pawar and Republican Party of India leader Ramdas Athawale. His death also elicited reaction from Bollywood, partly as a result of his son's career in filmdom. These included Madhuri Dixit, Karan Johar, Bipasha Basu, Dia Mirza and Raveena Tandon, as well as Shah Rukh Khan who called Deshmukh a "wonderful" gentleman and said "I'm feeling very sorry. I have known him (Vilasrao) for years. Riteish is a close friend of mine. I spoke to him. I am very sad, it is very unexpected."

His cremation took place on 15 August, India's Independence Day at Babhalgaon, his village, in Latur district.

== Legacy ==
• In 2019, Vilasrao Deshmukh Government Medical College, Latur was named after him.

• In 2019, Eastern Freeway (Mumbai) was named after him.

== See also ==
- Prakashdada Solanke
- Baburao Narsingrao Kokate (Adaskar)
- Panditrao Ramrao Deshmukh

== Notes ==
| Preceded by Narayan Rane | Chief Minister of Maharashtra; 18 October 1999 – 16 January 2003 | Succeeded by Sushilkumar Shinde |
| Preceded by Sushilkumar Shinde | Chief Minister of Maharashtra; 1 November 2004 – 4 December 2008 | Succeeded by Ashok Chavan |
| Preceded by Santosh Mohan Dev | Minister of Heavy Industries and Public Enterprises; 28 May 2009 – 19 January 2011 | Succeeded by Praful Patel |
| Preceded by C. P. Joshi | Minister of Rural Development; 19 January 2011 – 12 July 2011 | Succeeded by Jairam Ramesh |
| Preceded by C. P. Joshi | Minister of Panchayati Raj; 19 January 2011 – 12 July 2011 | Succeeded by Kishore Chandra Deo |
| Preceded by Pawan Kumar Bansal | Minister of Science and Technology; 12 July 2011 – 14 August 2012 | Succeeded by Vayalar Ravi |
| Preceded by Pawan Kumar Bansal | Minister of Earth Sciences; 12 July 2011 – 14 August 2012 | Succeeded by Vayalar Ravi |
| Preceded by Sharad Pawar | Mumbai Cricket Association; 15 July 2011 – 14 August 2012 | Succeeded by Ravi Savant |
