= Vandre =

Vandre may refer to:

- Bandra, a suburb in Mumbai, India
  - Vandre (Vidhan Sabha constituency)
  - Vandre East (Vidhan Sabha constituency)
  - Vandre West (Vidhan Sabha constituency)
- Vandre, Bhiwandi, a village in Thane district of India
- Isabelle Vandre (born 1989), German politician

== See also ==
- Vandré (disambiguation)
