= 2015 elections in India =

Elections in India
- 2015

== Legislative assembly elections ==
Date(s)	State/UT	Government before	Chief Minister before election	Government after	Elected Chief Minister	Maps
7 February 2015	Delhi	President's Rule		Aam Aadmi Party	Arvind Kejriwal	
12 October 2015 – 5 November 2015	Bihar	Janata Dal (United)	Nitish Kumar	Rashtriya Janata Dal	Nitish Kumar	
12 October 2015 – 5 November 2015	Bihar	Janata Dal (United)	Nitish Kumar	Janata Dal (United)	Nitish Kumar	
12 October 2015 – 5 November 2015	Bihar	Rashtriya Janata Dal	Nitish Kumar	Indian National Congress	Nitish Kumar	

The elections in India in 2015 include the two state legislative assembly elections. The tenures of the state legislative assembly of Bihar were due to expire during the year, and the Delhi Legislative Assembly re-election would also be held due to the inability to form the government.

== Parliamentary by-election ==
S.No	Date	Constituency	MP before election	Party before election	Elected MP	Party after election
1	13 February 2015	Bangaon	Kapil Krishna Thakur	All India Trinamool Congress	Mamata Thakur	All India Trinamool Congress
2	21 November 2015	Warangal	Kadiyam Srihari	Telangana Rashtra Samithi	Pasunuri Dayakar	Telangana Rashtra Samithi
3	21 November 2015	Ratlam	Dileep Singh Bhuria	Bharatiya Janata Party	Kantilal Bhuria	Indian National Congress

== Assembly by-elections ==
=== Andhra Pradesh ===
S.No	Date	Constituency	MLA before election	Party before election	Elected MLA	Party after election
1	13 February 2015	Tirupati	M.Venkataramana	Telugu Desam Party	M Suguna	Telugu Desam Party

=== Arunachal Pradesh ===
S.No	Date	Constituency	MLA before election	Party before election	Elected MLA	Party after election
1	13 February 2015	Liromba	Jarbom Gamlin	Indian National Congress	Nyamar Karbak	Indian National Congress

=== Goa ===
S.No	Date	Constituency	MLA before election	Party before election	Elected MLA	Party after election
1	13 February 2015	Panaji	Manohar Parrikar	Bharatiya Janata Party	Sidharth Kuncalienker	Bharatiya Janata Party

=== Jharkhand ===
S.No	Date	Constituency	MLA before election	Party before election	Elected MLA	Party after election
1	14 December 2015	Lohardaga	Kamal Kishore Bhagat	All Jharkhand Students Union	Sukhdeo Bhagat	Indian National Congress

=== Kerala ===
S.No	Date	Constituency	MLA before election	Party before election	Elected MLA	Party after election
1	27 June 2015	Aruvikkara	G. Karthikeyen	Indian National Congress	K. S. Sabarinadhan	Indian National Congress

=== Madhya Pradesh ===
S.No	Date	Constituency	MLA before election	Party before election	Elected MLA	Party after election
1	27 June 2015	Garoth	Rajesh Yadav	Bharatiya Janata Party	Chander Singh Sisodia	Bharatiya Janata Party

=== Maharashtra ===
S.No	Date	Constituency	MLA before election	Party before election	Elected MLA	Party after election
1	13 February 2015	Mukhed	Govind Rathod	Bharatiya Janata Party	Tushar Rathod	Bharatiya Janata Party
2	11 April 2015	Tasgaon	R. R. Patil	Nationalist Congress Party	Suman Patil	Nationalist Congress Party
3	11 April 2015	Vandre East	Prakash Sawant	Shiv Sena	Trupti Sawant	Shiv Sena

=== Manipur ===
S.No	Date	Constituency	MLA before election	Party before election	Elected MLA	Party after election
1	21 November 2015	Thongju	Thongam Biswajit Singh	All India Trinamool Congress	Thongam Biswajit Singh	Bharatiya Janata Party
2	21 November 2015	Thangmeiband	Khumukcham Joykishan	All India Trinamool Congress	Khumukcham Joykishan	Bharatiya Janata Party

=== Meghalaya ===
S.No	Date	Constituency	MLA before election	Party before election	Elected MLA	Party after election
1	27 June 2015	Chokpot	Clifford Marak	Garo National Council	Bluebell Sangma	Indian National Congress
2	21 November 2015	Nongstoin	Hopingstone Lyngdoh	Hill State People's Democratic Party	Diostar Jyndiang	Hill State People's Democratic Party

=== Mizoram ===
S.No	Date	Constituency	MLA before election	Party before election	Elected MLA	Party after election
1	21 November 2015	Aizawl North 3	Lal Thanzara	Indian National Congress	Lal Thanzara	Indian National Congress

=== Tamil Nadu ===
S.No	Date	Constituency	MLA before election	Party before election	Elected MLA	Party after election
1	13 February 2015	Srirangam	J. Jayalalithaa	All India Anna Dravida Munnetra Kazhagam	S. Valarmathi	All India Anna Dravida Munnetra Kazhagam
2	27 June 2015	Radhakrishnan Nagar	P. Vetriivel	All India Anna Dravida Munnetra Kazhagam	J. Jayalalithaa	All India Anna Dravida Munnetra Kazhagam

=== Tripura ===
S.No	Date	Constituency	MLA before election	Party before election	Elected MLA	Party after election
1	27 June 2015	Pratapgarh	Anil Sarkar	Communist Party of India (Marxist)	Ramu Das	Communist Party of India (Marxist)
2	27 June 2015	Surma	Sudhir Das	Communist Party of India (Marxist)	Anjan Das	Communist Party of India (Marxist)

=== Uttarakhand ===
S.No	Date	Constituency	MLA before election	Party before election	Elected MLA	Party after election
1	15 April 2015	Bhagwanpur	Surendra Rakesh	Bahujan Samaj Party	Mamta Rakesh	Indian National Congress

=== Uttar Pradesh ===
S.No	Date	Constituency	MLA before election	Party before election	Elected MLA	Party after election
1	11 April 2015	Charkhari	Kaptan Singh	Samajwadi Party	Urmila Rajput	Samajwadi Party
2	30 April 2015	Pharenda	Bajrang Bahadur Singh	Bharatiya Janata Party	Vinod Tiwari	Samajwadi Party

=== West Bengal ===
S.No	Date	Constituency	MLA before election	Party before election	Elected MLA	Party after election
1	13 February 2015	Krishnaganj	Sushil Biswas	All India Trinamool Congress	Satyajit Biswas	All India Trinamool Congress
