= Divya S. Iyer =

Indian Administrative Service Officer, medical doctor, and author

managing director of Vizhinjam International Seaport Limited
- In office 13 October 2023 – 08 June 2026
- Appointed by: Government of Kerala
- Minister: Pinarayi Vijayan
- Preceded by: Adeela Abdulla, IAS
- Succeeded by: Geromic George IAS

District Collector of Pathanamthitta
- In office 12 July 2021 – 20 October 2023
- Appointed by: Chief Minister of Kerala
- Chief Minister: Pinarayi Vijayan
- Succeeded by: Shibu A

Mission Director of the Mahatma Gandhi NREGA
- In office 2018 – 7 July 2021
- Appointed by: Chief Minister of Kerala
- Chief Minister: Pinarayi Vijayan

Personal details
- Born: 16 October 1984 (age 41) Thiruvananthapuram, Kerala, India
- Spouse: K. S. Sabarinadhan (m. 2017)
- Education: M.B.B.S.
- Profession: Civil servant; Medical doctor
- Divya S. Iyer's voice Few words recorded from the Ted Talk programme held in April 2017.

Divya Sesha Iyer (born 16 October 1984) is an Indian Administrative Service (IAS) officer, medical doctor, author, editor, and public speaker serving in the state of Kerala. As of June 2026, she serves as the Principal Director of the Local Self Government Department. Previously, she held various administrative roles, including Managing Director of Vizhinjam International Seaport Thiruvananthapuram, Director of the Kerala Solid Waste Management Project, District Collector of Pathanamthitta, and Mission Director of the Mahatma Gandhi National Rural Employment Guarantee Scheme in Kerala.

In addition to her administrative career, Iyer is an author and editor whose published works address governance, mythology, gender issues, and civil service preparation. She has also participated in literary and cultural forums and contributes to public discussions on leadership, governance, and social development.

== Early life and education ==
Iyer was born in Thiruvananthapuram, Kerala, on 16 October 1984 as the elder daughter of Sesha Iyer, a retired Indian Space Research Organisation employee, and Bhagavathy Ammal, a State Bank of Travancore employee.

Iyer was educated at Holy Angels' Convent School, Trivandrum. She scored the third rank in the SSLC exam conducted by the Kerala Board of Public Examinations. She then studied at St. Thomas Central School, Trivandrum, before completing her MBBS from the Christian Medical College, Vellore.

Iyer's transition from medicine to administration was driven by a desire to address public health and social issues at a systemic level. She cleared the UPSC exams twice, initially joining the IRS before qualifying for the IAS in 2014.

== Career ==
Iyer was a doctor before she began her civil service career and continues to practice medicine. She joined IAS in 2014 and was assistant collector at Kottayam before becoming Sub-Collector of Thiruvananthapuram.

In 2016, as the nodal officer of Systematic Voter Education and Electoral Participation (SVEEP) under the Election Commission and assistant collector in Kottayam, Iyer created a voter awareness campaign with the motto "My Vote My Future" to help improve voter turnout. In 2016, she also wrote and sang the song 'Viral thumbil Nammude Bhaavi' to promote awareness of voting rights and to encourage voting, which was released during a press conference by the District Collector.

In 2018, Iyer was transferred from her role as Sub-Collector to Deputy Secretary in the Local Self-Government Department.

=== Mission Director of the Mahatma Gandhi NREGA ===
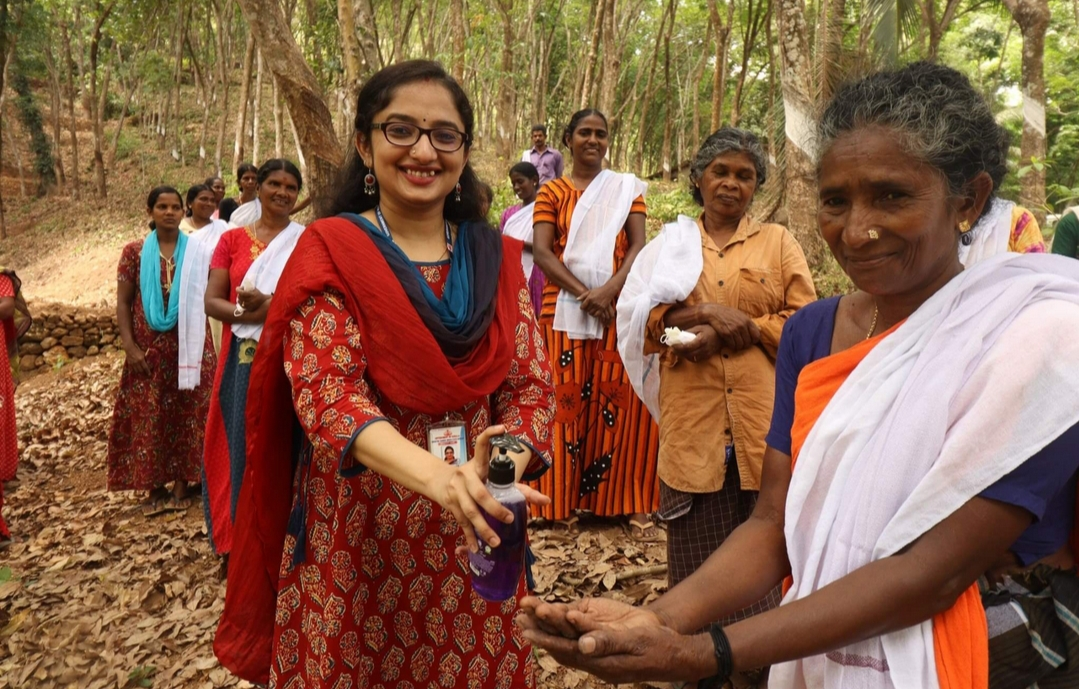
Iyer at the #BreakTheChain awareness campaign during the COVID-19 pandemic.

Iyer then served as the Mission Director of the Mahatma Gandhi National Rural Employment Guarantee Scheme (MNREGS). In this role, she was named one of the Kerala Insider 50 Most Influential People of 2020, due to her prominent role in the #BreakTheChain awareness campaign during the COVID-19 pandemic.

=== District Collector ===
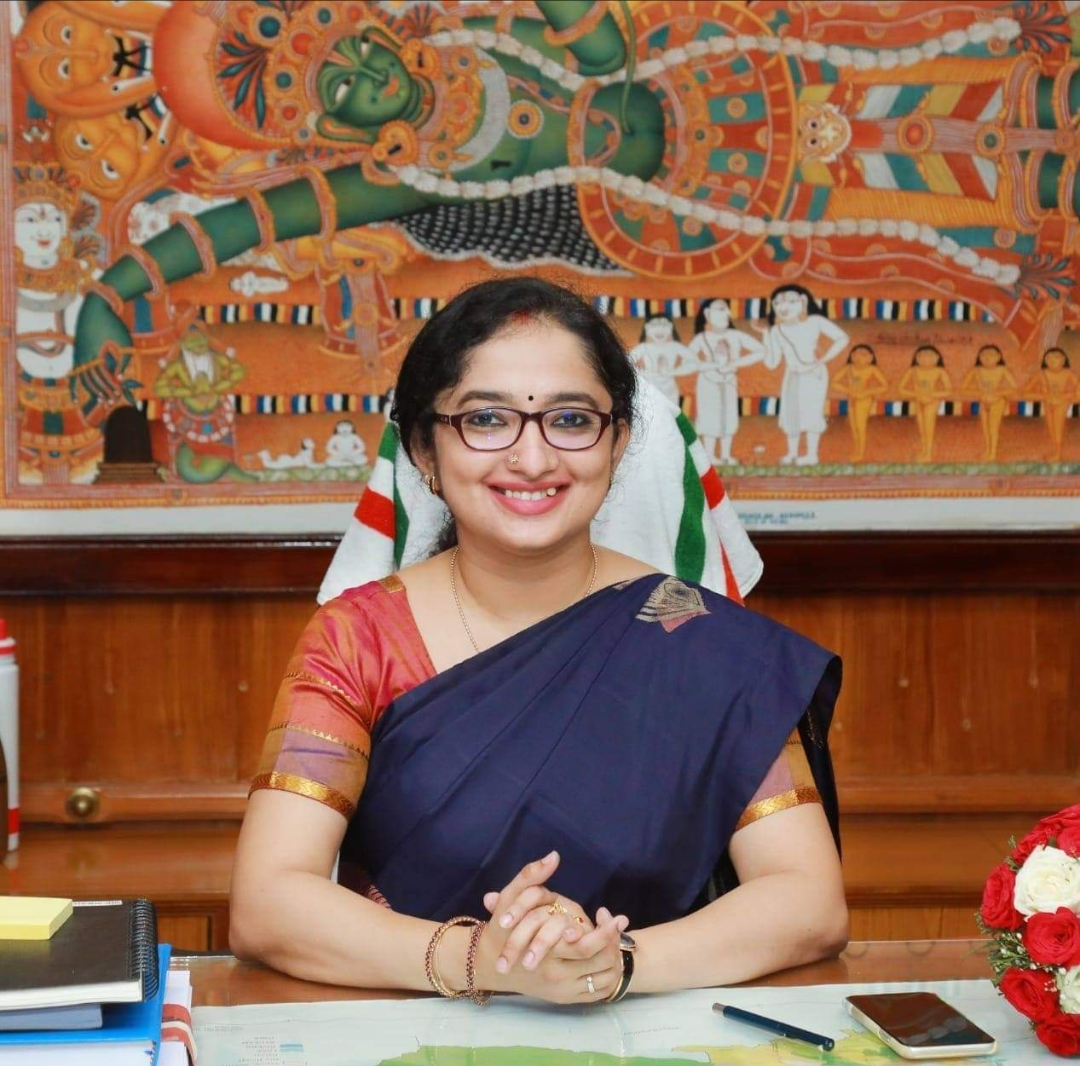
Iyer at Pathanamthitta Collectorate office.

On 12 July 2021, Iyer became the 36th district collector of Pathanamthitta. In August 2021, she said she plans to continue measures to address the COVID-19 pandemic, as well as development of the district and measures that promote the empowerment of women.

In 2021, following the decision of the State government to award title deeds to farmers in Konni following decades of protests, Iyer prepared and submitted a report with forest division officers as part of the process to distribute the deeds.

In December 2021, Iyer distributed gender neutral school uniforms to the students of Government Tribal LP School Attathodu in Ranni of Pathanamthitta district in Kerala.

In 2021 and 2022, Iyer played a key role in coordinating the annual Sabarimala pilgrimage, drawing public attention and appreciation for the administrative efforts. The district collector's involvement in pilgrimage management also attracted notice, particularly after a recital of Ayyappa keerthana at Pamba during the reception of the Thanka Anki (golden ornaments) procession from the Aranmula temple to Sabarimala circulated widely on social media.

In June 2022, a video of Iyer attending an official function with her toddler went viral on social media. Responding to both support and criticism, she stated, "I am a 24x7 mother and a 24x7 District Collector," emphasizing that her roles as a parent and as an administrative officer cannot be separated.

Divya took part in a flash mob with students of Catholicate College, as part of the MG University Union Arts Festival.

=== Vizhinjam International Seaport ===
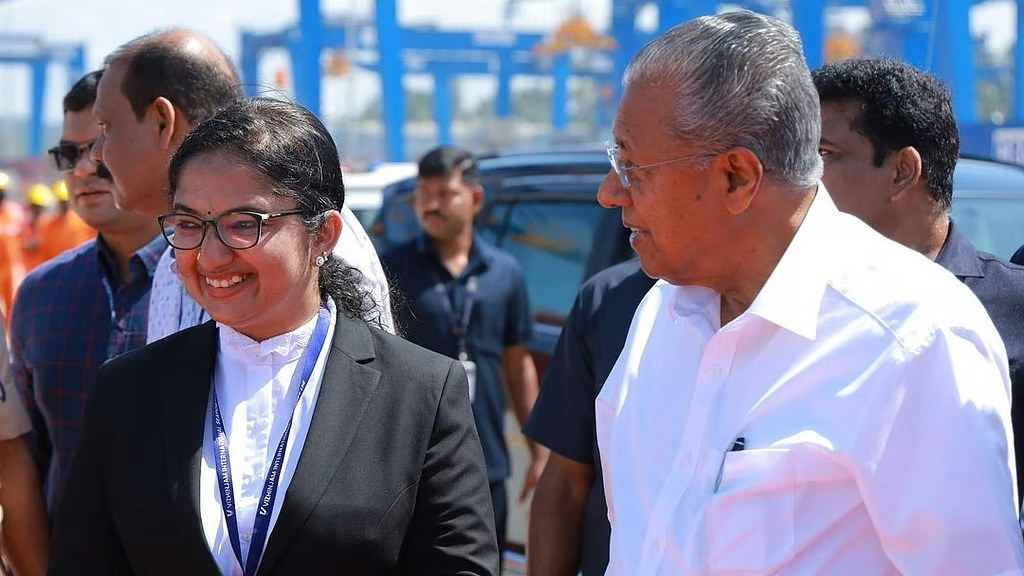
Divya with Chief Minister of Kerala, Pinarayi Vijayan, visiting the Vizhinjam International Seaport during an official inspection/inauguration event.

In October 2023, Iyer was appointed as the managing director of Vizhinjam International Seaport Limited (VISL). In this role, she oversees the strategic development and operational management of the Vizhinjam International Transshipment Deepwater Multipurpose Seaport, which is expected to reduce India's reliance on foreign ports for transshipment.

Under Iyer's leadership, the port aims to integrate sustainable practices, enhance logistical efficiencies, and improve India's maritime trade competitiveness. The Adani Group's ports division has committed an additional $1.2 billion to expand the port's capacity to 3 million TEU by 2028. Iyer has said that this project is a "game changer" for Kerala's economic landscape, fostering port-led industrialisation and attracting global investment.

=== Director of the Kerala Solid Waste Management Project (KSWMP) ===
In October 2023, Iyer was appointed as the Director of the Kerala Solid Waste Management Project (KSWMP). The project, partially funded by the World Bank with an estimated outlay of ₹2,300 crore, aims to develop an integrated and sustainable framework for managing municipal solid waste across Kerala's urban local bodies. In her capacity as Director, Iyer oversees policy formulation, resource allocation, and the adoption of modern waste-processing technologies, including biomining and material recovery facilities.

Under Iyer's leadership, KSWMP has emphasized decentralized waste management systems, involving community-level participation and collaboration with local self-governing institutions. This approach is intended to reduce environmental impact and public health risks by minimizing the accumulation of untreated waste in landfills. The project also integrates awareness campaigns, capacity-building programs for municipal staff, and partnerships with private entities to promote innovative waste-to-energy solutions.

Iyer's appointment to the project was announced alongside her designation as managing director of the Vizhinjam International Seaport, forming part of a broader administrative restructuring that reassigned several district collectors. Through her dual roles, she is credited with fostering a cross-sectoral approach to sustainable development in Kerala, particularly by aligning large-scale infrastructure projects with environmental stewardship.

== Participation in literary festivals ==
Iyer has participated as a speaker at the Kerala Literature Festival (KLF), engaging in discussions on parenting, governance, and cultural transformation. During the 2025 edition, she spoke in sessions addressing changing family dynamics and child development. She also participated in subsequent editions of the festival following Kozhikode's designation as a UNESCO City of Literature.

In 2025, she contributed an article titled "Shaping Cinema’s Future" to Kerala Calling, analyzing policy discussions aimed at creating a more inclusive and sustainable film industry, including issues related to gender justice and technological changes in production.

== Public engagement and mentorship ==
Iyer has delivered public lectures and mentorship sessions for civil service aspirants, advocating structured preparation methods. In her TEDx talk titled Demystifying Versatility, she argued for versatility as a leadership strength, drawing on her experiences in medicine, administration, and cultural pursuits.

== Published works ==
Books and publications by Divya S. Iyer
Year	Title	Role	Publisher	Language	ISBN	Ref.
2014	Applied Diplomacy – Through the Prism of Mythology	Editor	Wisdom Tree	English	978-8183283816	
2019	Pathfinder – Civil Services Main Examination	Author	DC Books	English	978-8126442935	
2021	Ethrayum Priyappettavalkk	Translator	DC Books	Malayalam	978-9354820120	
2022	Kaioppitta Vazhikal	Author	DC Books	Malayalam	978-9354820823	
2022	The Indian Woman	Author	DC Books	English	978-9354826979	
—	The Bane of Party Drugs in India	Co-editor	—	English	—	

== Awards and honors ==
Awards and recognition received by Divya S. Iyer
Year	Award	Granting Body	Basis of Recognition	Ref.
2020	50 Most Influential People of Kerala	Kerala Insider	Leadership during the #BreakTheChain campaign.	
2023	Excellence in Good Governance Award	Union Home Ministry	Outstanding performance as District Collector of Pathanamthitta.	
2023	Indian Express Excellence in Governance Award	The Indian Express Group	Implementation of structured disaster risk mitigation and planning.	
2025	News18 Kerala Business Awards	News18 Kerala	Leadership at Vizhinjam Port and contributions to the regional business climate.	
2025	International Inspirational Woman in Administration	GISR Foundation	Versatile administrative leadership across multiple sectors.	
2025	Precious Daughter of India Award	Government of Rajasthan	Long-standing commitment to social welfare and public administration.	

== Discography ==
Year	Song	Film / album / for	Language	Ref
2016	"Azhakerum Nadinu Chithram"	SVEEP	Malayalam	
2016	"Ethirkalam Nam Kayyil"	Election Commission of India – Tamil Nadu	Tamil	

== Personal life ==
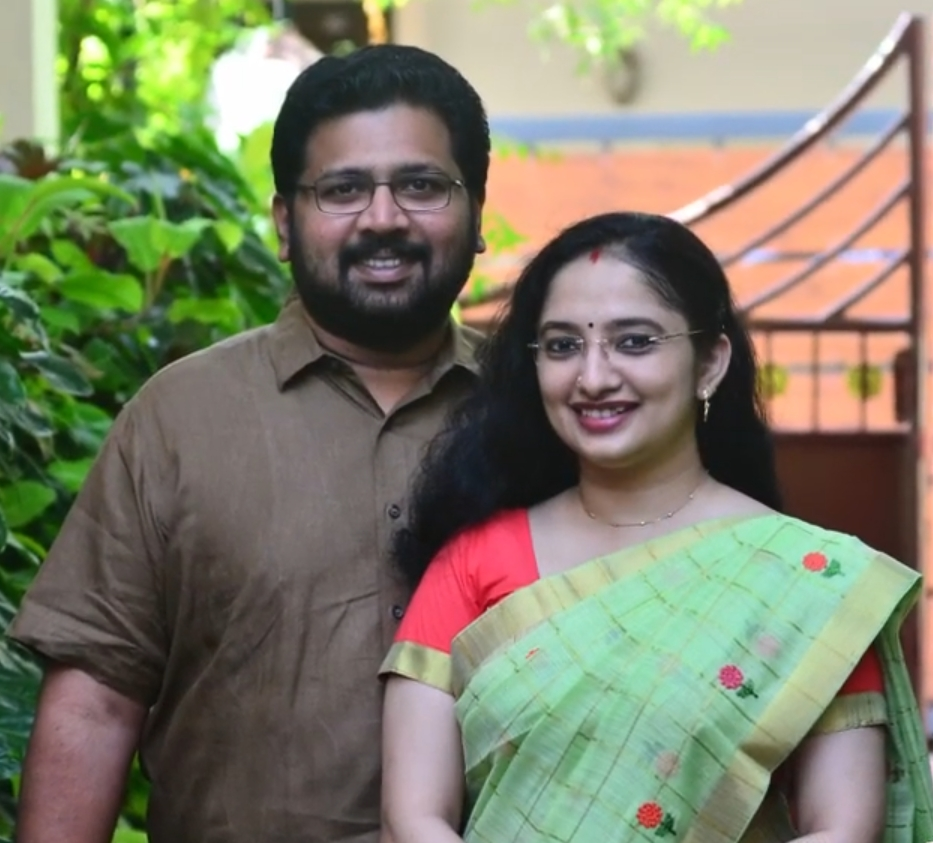
Iyer with her husband K. S. Sabarinadhan

Divya S. Iyer is married to K. S. Sabarinadhan, a politician and former Member of the Legislative Assembly (MLA) representing the Aruvikkara constituency for the Indian National Congress. The couple married on 30 June 2017 at the Kumarakovil temple in Thuckalay, Kanyakumari district. This was the first instance of a sitting MLA and a serving IAS officer marrying in Kerala.

The couple has a son, born in 2019. Iyer has spoken about the challenges of balancing motherhood with high-pressure administrative roles, discussing the importance of a supportive family structure and the need for breaking gendered stereotypes on parenting and professional identity.
