= Baba Siddique =

Indian politician (1958–2024)

Baba Ziauddin Siddique
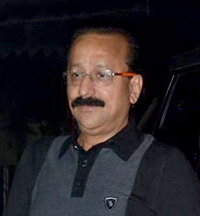
- Siddique in 2021

Minister of State for Food & Civil Supplies (FDA) and Labour, Government of Maharashtra
- In office 9 November 2004 – 1 December 2008
- Chief Minister: Vilasrao Deshmukh

Member of Maharashtra Legislative Assembly
- In office 2009–2014
- Preceded by: constituency established
- Succeeded by: Ashish Shelar
- Constituency: Vandre West
- In office 1999–2009
- Preceded by: Jayashree Nayak
- Succeeded by: constituency dissolved
- Constituency: Vandre

Member of Parliamentary Board in Maharashtra Pradesh Congress Committee
- In office 19 May 2019 – 8 February 2024

Chairperson and Senior Vice-President of Mumbai Regional Congress Committee
- In office 15 October 2014 – 8 February 2024

Chairman of Maharashtra Housing and Area Development Authority (MHADA)
- In office 2000–2004

Councillor of Mumbai Municipal Corporation
- In office 1993–2003

Personal details
- Born: 13 September 1958 Patna, Bihar, India
- Died: 12 October 2024 (aged 66) Mumbai, Maharashtra, India
- Cause of death: Assassination by gunshots
- Party: Nationalist Congress Party (February–October 2024)
- Other political affiliations: Indian National Congress (1976–2024)
- Spouse: Shehzeen Siddique
- Children: 2, including Zeeshan
- Education: M. M. K. College

Baba Ziauddin Siddique (13 September 1958 – 12 October 2024) was an Indian politician who was a Member of Legislative Assembly (MLA) in the state of Maharashtra for the Vandre West Assembly constituency. He was the MLA for three consecutive terms in 1999, 2004 and 2009, and had also served as Minister of State for Food & Civil Supplies (FDA) and Labour under Chief Minister Vilasrao Deshmukh between 2004 and 2008.

Siddique had also served as Municipal Corporator earlier for two consecutive terms between 1992 and 1997. Before his death, he served as the Chairperson & Senior Vice-President of the Mumbai Regional Congress Committee & Parliamentary Board of the Maharashtra Pradesh Congress Committee. On 8 February 2024, he resigned from the primary membership of the Indian National Congress. He later joined the Nationalist Congress Party led by Ajit Pawar on 12 February 2024.

Siddique was shot dead on the night of 12 October 2024 in front of his son Zeeshan's office.

== Political career ==
Ziauddin Siddique, also known as Baba Siddique, joined the Indian National Congress (INC), as a teenager, in 1977. He participated in various students' movements of the time as a member of the Mumbai chapter of the National Students Union of India — the students wing of the INC. He went on to become the General Secretary of the Bandra Taluka of the Bandra Youth Congress in 1980 and was elected its president within the next two years. In 1988, he became president of the Mumbai Youth Congress. Four years later he was elected a Municipal Councilor in the Mumbai Municipal Corporation and was re-elected to the position five years later. He became an MLA in 1999 from the Bandra West Assembly Constituency. He was re-elected in 2004 and 2009, serving three consecutive terms. Siddique was also appointed Chairman of the MHADA Mumbai Board by the Government of Maharashtra to serve from 2000 to 2004. He was also appointed Minister of State for Food & Civil Supplies, Labour, FDA and Consumer Protection for the Government of Maharashtra and served from 2004 to 2008. In 2011, he funded the creation of an Eco-Garden in Bandra-Khar.

== Positions held ==
- Member of the National Students Union of India (Mumbai) (1977)
- General Secretary of the Bandra Taluka of the Bandra Youth Congress (1980)
- President of the Bandra Taluka of the Bandra Youth Congress (1982)
- Municipal Councilor in the Mumbai Municipal Corporation (1993–1998), (1998–2003)
- Member of legislative Assembly (MLA) – (1999–2004), (2004–2009) and (2009–2014)
- Minister of State for Food & Civil Supplies, Labour and FDA, (2004–2008)
- Chairman, MHADA Mumbai Board (2000–2004)
- Chairperson & Senior Vice-President of the Mumbai Regional Congress Committee (2014)
- Parliamentary Board of the Maharashtra Pradesh Congress Committee (2019)
- Member of the Nationalist Congress Party. Assumed office on 12 February 2024

== Personal life ==
Baba Siddique was born in Patna, Bihar. His family is originally from Shekh Toli village in Gopalganj district of Bihar. Baba Siddique was married to Shehzeen Siddique. They had two children; a daughter, Arshia Siddique, and a son, Zeeshan Siddique.

== Death ==
At the age of 66, Baba Siddique was shot on 12 October 2024 in Kherwadi area of Mumbai by three unidentified men. The attack took place near the office of his son, Zeeshan Siddique, who was then the sitting MLA of Vandre East Assembly constituency. He was then rushed to Lilavati Hospital but succumbed to injuries. Huge crowd was seen outside the hospital while he was admitted in the critical state. The then deputy CM of Maharashtra Devendra Fadnavis also rushed to the hospital.

=== Perpetrators ===
Two people were taken into custody, identified as Gurmail Baljit Singh from Haryana and Dharmaraj Rajesh Kashyap from Uttar Pradesh. The police later named two more suspects, Shivkumar Gautam from Uttar Pradesh, and Mohammad Jaseen Akhtar. The police arrested Praveen Lonkar, who they say provided logistics support, and claimed that his absconding brother Shubham Lonkar was the mastermind behind the shooting. On 15 October 2024, police made a fourth arrest, that of Harishkumar Balakram Nisad from Uttar Pradesh. The Mumbai Police confirmed that the gang led by Lawrence Bishnoi, who is lodged in Sabarmati Central Jail, was involved in the assassination.
