= Aruvikkara Assembly constituency =

Constituency of the Kerala legislative assembly in India

Coordinates: 8.57°N 77.02°E

Aruvikkara
- Constituency No. 136 for the Kerala Legislative Assembly
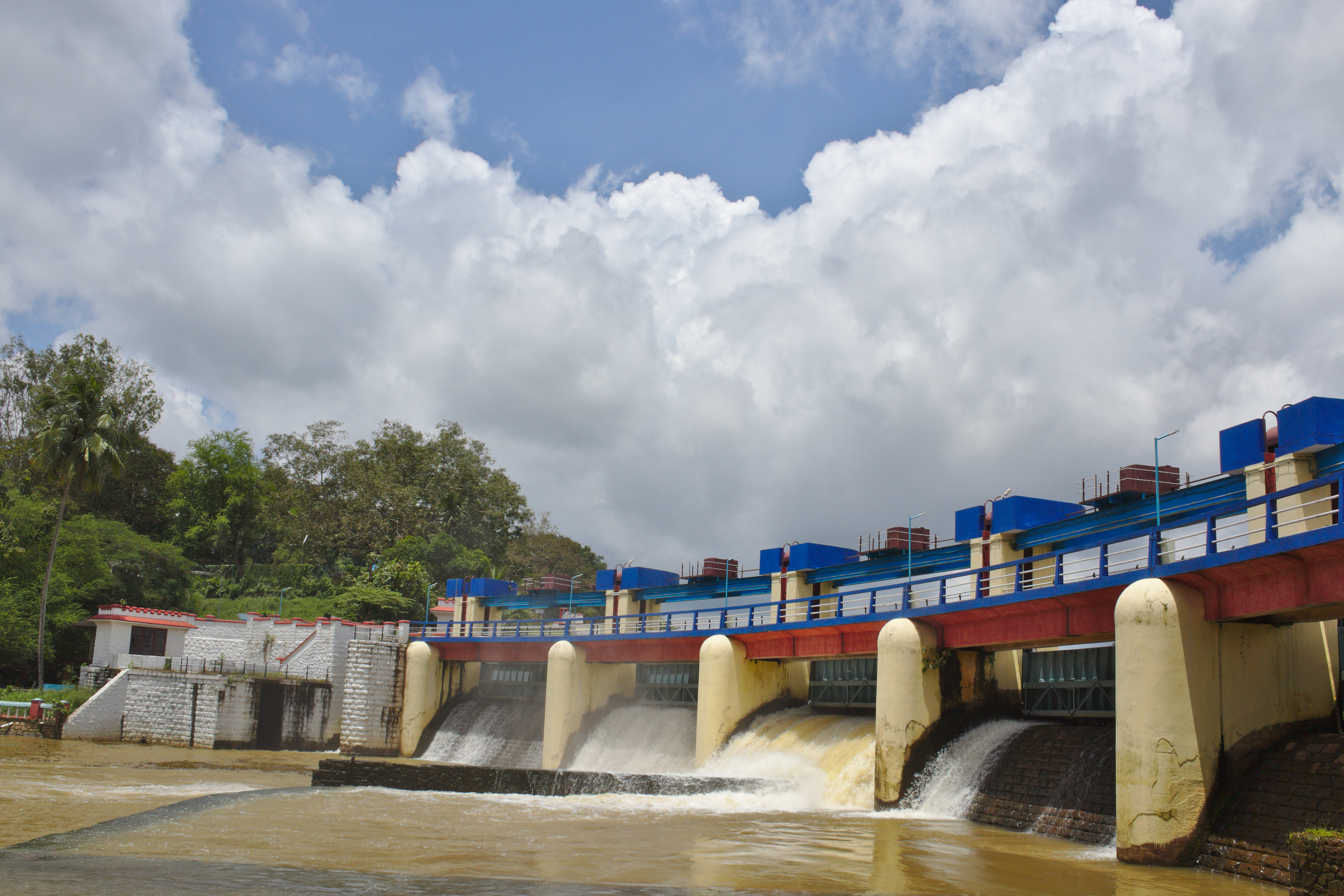
- Aruvikkara Dam

Constituency details
- Country: India
- Region: South India
- State: Kerala
- District: Thiruvananthapuram
- Lok Sabha constituency: Attingal
- Established: 2008
- Total electors: 1,93,873 (2021)
- Reservation: None

Member of Legislative Assembly
- 16th Kerala Legislative Assembly
- Incumbent G. Steephen
- Party: CPI(M)
- Alliance: LDF
- Elected year: 2026

Aruvikkara is one of the 140 state legislative assembly constituencies in Kerala in southern India. It is also one of the seven state legislative assembly constituencies included in Attingal Lok Sabha constituency. As of the 2026 Assembly elections, the current MLA is G. Steephen of Communist Party of India (Marxist).

== Local self-governed segments ==
Aruvikkara Assembly constituency is composed of the following local self-governed segments:

Name	Status (Grama panchayat/Municipality)	Taluk
Aruvikkara	Grama panchayat	Nedumangad
Aryanadu	Grama panchayat	Nedumangad
Tholicode	Grama panchayat	Nedumangad
Vithura	Grama panchayat	Nedumangad
Uzhamalackal	Grama panchayat	Nedumangad
Vellanad	Grama panchayat	Nedumangad and Kattakada
Kuttichal	Grama panchayat	Kattakada
Poovachal	Grama panchayat	Kattakada

== Members of the Legislative Assembly ==
Election	Member	Political party
2011	G. Karthikeyan	Indian National Congress
2015^	K. S. Sabarinadhan	Indian National Congress
2016	K. S. Sabarinadhan	Indian National Congress
2021	G. Steephen	Communist Party of India
2026	G. Steephen	Communist Party of India

^by-election

== Election results ==
Percentage change (±%) denotes the change in the number of votes from the immediate previous election.

=== 2026 ===
2026 Kerala Legislative Assembly election: Aruvikkara
Party	Candidate	Votes	%	±%
CPI(M)	G. Steephen	61,907	42.14	▼3.69
INC	V. S. Sivakumar	59,064	40.21	▼2.16
BJP	Vivek Gopan	23,760	16.17	▲5.62
BSP	Santhosh Kumar S.	687	0.46	
Independent	V. S. Sivakumar	303	0.20	
Independent	R. Stephen	264	0.17	
Independent	Adv. S. Sivakumar	118	0.08	
NOTA	None of the above	775	0.52	▼0.35
Margin of victory		2,843	1.93	▼0.35
Turnout		1,46,878		
CPI(M) hold		Swing	▼3.69	

=== 2021 ===
There were 1,93,873 registered voters in Aruvikkara Constituency for the 2021 Kerala Assembly election.

2021 Kerala Legislative Assembly election: Aruvikkara
Party	Candidate	Votes	%	±%
CPI(M)	G. Steephen	66,776	45.83	▲11.33
INC	K. S. Sabarinathan	61,730	42.37	▼6.95
BJP	C. Sivankutty	15,379	10.55	▼3.57
NOTA	None of the above	900	0.62	▲0.17
Margin of victory		5046	3.47	▼11.35
Turnout		1,46,160	75.39	▼0.47
CPI(M) gain from INC		Swing	▲11.33	

=== 2016 ===
There were 189,505 registered voters in the constituency for the 2016 Kerala Assembly election.

2016 Kerala Legislative Assembly election: Aruvikkara
Party	Candidate	Votes	%	±%
INC	K. S. Sabarinathan	70,910	49.32	▲9.30
CPI(M)	A. A. Rasheed	49,596	34.50	▲1.66
BJP	Rajasenan	20,294	14.12	▼10.08
SDPI	M. A. Jaleel	707	0.49	–
BSP	Chitralekha E.	673	0.47	–
NOTA	None of the above	640	0.45	–
Independent politician	Sabarinath	331	0.23	–
Independent politician	Cherappally Viswanathan	188	0.13	–
Independent politician	Rasheed	158	0.11	–
Independent politician	A. P. Kakkadu	134	0.09	–
Independent politician	Ajitha B.	130	0.09	–
Margin of victory		21,314	14.82	▲7.64
Turnout		1,43,761	75.86	▼0.30
INC hold		Swing	▲9.30	

=== 2015 by-election ===
Due to the death of the sitting MLA G. Karthikeyan, Aruvikkara Assembly constituency held a by-election on 27 June 2015. There were 185,216 registered voters for this election in the constituency.

2015 by-election: Aruvikkara
Party	Candidate	Votes	%	±%
INC	K. S. Sabarinathan	56448	39.61	▼8.77
CPI	M. Vijayakumar	46320	32.51	
BJP	O. Rajagopal	34145	23.96	▲17.59
Independent	K. Das	1,197	0.85	
PDP	Poonthura Siraj	703	0.50	▼0.25
Independent	P. K. Sukumaran	481	0.34	
Independent	Sunil M. Karani	422	0.30	
	Thomas Kaithaparambil	383	0.27	
Independent	Irinchayam Suresh	354	0.25	
ABHM	Sreejita T. R.	171	0.12	
Independent	Sabarinath M. S.	143	0.10	
	N. Sasidharan Pillai	93	0.07	
Independent	Vijaya Kumar B.	69	0.05	
IGP	K. M. Sivaprasad	62	0.04	
Independent	Vijaya Kumar Nair	40	0.03	
Independent	K. G. Mohanan	35	0.02	
Margin of victory		10,128	7.18	▲9.30
Turnout		1,41,066	76.16	▲5.88
INC hold		Swing	▼8.77	

=== 2011 ===
There were 165,638 registered voters in the constituency for the 2011 election.

2011 Kerala Legislative Assembly election: Aruvikkara
Party	Candidate	Votes	%	±%
INC	G. Karthikeyan	56,797	48.79	
RSP	Ambalathara Sreedharan Nair	46,123	39.62	
BJP	Sivankutty C.	7,694	6.61	
BSP	A. Balan	1,746	1.50	
Independent	Poovathoor S. Rajeev	972	0.83	
Independent	Sanil V. O.	913	0.78	
Independent	R. Rajappan	753	0.65	
Independent	Karakulam Sathyakumar	651	0.56	
SUCI(C)	S. Sreekumar	525	0.45	
Independent	Latha B. Vellumannadi	244	0.21	
Margin of victory		10,674	9.17	
Turnout		1,16,418	70.28	
INC win (new seat)				

== See also ==
- Aruvikkara
- Thiruvananthapuram district
- List of constituencies of the Kerala Legislative Assembly
- 2016 Kerala Legislative Assembly election
