= Thongju Assembly constituency =

Legislative Assembly constituency in Manipur State, India

Coordinates: 24.736°N 93.929°E

Thongju
- Constituency No. 5 for the Manipur Legislative Assembly
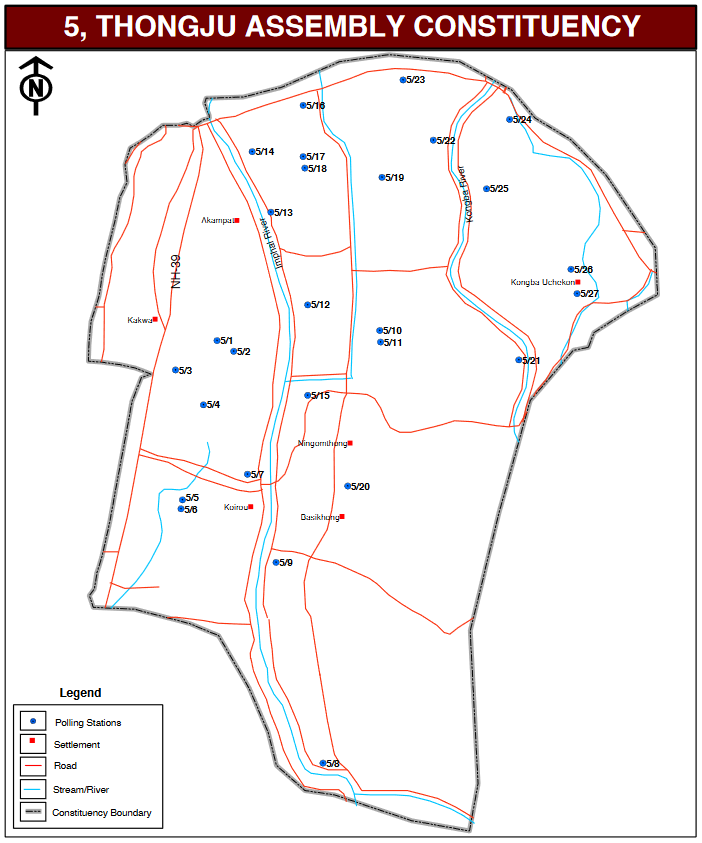

Constituency details
- Country: India
- Region: Northeast India
- State: Manipur
- District: Imphal East
- Lok Sabha constituency: Inner Manipur
- Established: 1967
- Total electors: 32,132
- Reservation: None

Member of Legislative Assembly
- 12th Manipur Legislative Assembly
- Incumbent Thongam Biswajit Singh
- Party: Bharatiya Janata Party
- Elected year: 2022

Thongju (Vidhan Sabha constituency) is one of the 60 Vidhan Sabha constituencies in the Indian state of Manipur.

== Extent ==
Thongju constituency is the 5th among the 60 constituencies of Manipur. It has 45 parts namely:- 1 - Thongju Lilando lampak (A), 2 - Thongju Lilando lampak (B), 3 - Thongju Ningomthong(A), 4 - Thongju Ningomthong (B), 5 - Kakwa Lamdaibung, 6 - Kakwa Nameirakpam Leikai, 7 - Thongju Pheijaleitong (A), 8 - Thongju Pheijaleitong (B), 9 - Pichu Lampak, 10 - Konok Khongnangkhong, 11 - Thongju Part-II Makha Leikai, 12 - Thongju Part-II Koirou, 13 - Thongju Waikhom Khongnang, 14 - Bashikhong Panthoibi Bazar, 15 - Kongba Irong, 16 - Bashikhong Bazar, 17 - Bashikhong Torban, 18 - Kitana Panung (A), 19 - Kitana Panung (B), 20 - Kitana Panung (C), 21 - Torban Pebiya Pandit Leikai, 22 - Mongkhang Lambi, 23 - Mongkhang Lambi (North), 24 - Torban Kshetri Leikai, 25 - Akampat, 26 - Khongman Mangjil (A), 27 - Khongman Mangjil (B), 28 - Khongman Mayai Leikai Zone-III(A), 29 - Khongman Zone-IV, 30 - Khongman, 31 - Khongman Zone-V(A), 32 - Khongman Zone-V(B), 33 - Wangkhei Loumanbi (A), 34 - Wangkhei Loumanbi (B), 35 - Nandeibam Leikai (A), 36 - Kongba Makha Nandeibam Leikai, 37 - Nandeibam Leikai (C), 38 - Uchekon Kongba Kshetri Leikai (A), 39 - Uchekon Kongba Kshetri Leikai (B), 40 - Uchekon Torban (A), 41 - Uchekon Torban (B), 42 - Takhok Mapal (A), 43 - Takhok Mapal (B), 44 - Takhok Mapal (C), and 45 - Takhok Mapal Wangkhei Loumanbi.

== Members of Legislative Assembly ==
Year	Member	Party
1967	S. A. Singh	Indian National Congress
1972	Oinam Tomba Singh	Manipur Peoples Party
1974	Hawaibam Shyama Singh	Socialist Party
1980	Oinam Tomba	Independent politician
1984	Nameirakpam Bisheshwor	Independent politician
1990	Thoudam Krishna Singh	Janata Dal
1995	Dr. Sapam Dhananjoy	Manipur Peoples Party
2000	Dr. Sapam Dhananjoy	Manipur State Congress Party
2002	Bijoy Koijam	Manipur State Congress Party
2007	Bijoy Koijam	Indian National Congress
2012	Thongam Biswajit Singh	All India Trinamool Congress
2015 by-election	Thongam Biswajit Singh	Bharatiya Janata Party
2017	Thongam Biswajit Singh	Bharatiya Janata Party
2022	Thongam Biswajit Singh	Bharatiya Janata Party

== Election results ==
Vote share of winning candidates
2022	51.98%
2017	62.61%
2015 by-election	55.88%
2012	41.81%
2007	50.36%
2002	35.26%
2000	27.87%
1995	30.51%
1990	51.54%
1984	32.64%
1980	26.53%
1974	31.80%
1972	46.81%
1967	35.97%

=== 2027 Assembly election ===
2027 Manipur Legislative Assembly election: Thongju
Party	Candidate	Votes	%	±%
INC				
NDA				
NOTA	None of the above			
Majority				
Turnout				
gain from		Swing		

=== Assembly Election 2022 ===
2022 Manipur Legislative Assembly election: Thongju
Party	Candidate	Votes	%	±%
BJP	Thongam Biswajit Singh	15,338	51.98%	−10.64%
INC	Seram Neken Singh	8,649	29.31%	−6.11%
JD(U)	Sanglakpam Preshyojit Sharma	4,849	16.43%	
NOTA	Nota	674	2.28%	0.80%
Margin of victory		6,689	22.67%	−4.53%
Turnout		29,510	91.84%	2.75%
Registered electors		32,132		6.63%
BJP hold		Swing	-10.64%	

=== Assembly Election 2017 ===
2017 Manipur Legislative Assembly election: Thongju
Party	Candidate	Votes	%	±%
BJP	Thongam Biswajit Singh	16,809	62.61%	
INC	Thokchom Ajit Singh	9,508	35.42%	−3.95%
NOTA	None of the Above	398	1.48%	
Margin of victory		7,301	27.20%	24.75%
Turnout		26,846	89.09%	−0.56%
Registered electors		30,135		9.68%
BJP gain from AITC		Swing		

=== 2015 by-election ===
2015 Manipur Legislative Assembly by-election: Thongju
Party	Candidate	Votes	%	±%
BJP	Thongam Biswajit Singh	14,606	55.88	N/A
INC	Bijoy Koijam	11,393	43.58	+4.21
MDPF	Dr. Gurumayun Tonsana Sharma	54	0.20	N/A
NOTA	None of the above	78	0.29	N/A
Majority		3,213	12.30	+9.86
Turnout		26,138	92.42	
Registered electors		28,281		
BJP gain from AITC		Swing		

=== Assembly Election 2012 ===
2012 Manipur Legislative Assembly election: Thongju
Party	Candidate	Votes	%	±%
AITC	Thongam Biswajit Singh	10,299	41.81%	
INC	Bijoy Koijam	9,696	39.37%	−11.00%
NCP	Kangujam Mangi Singh	2,641	10.72%	
CPI	Mangkhom Jayantakumar	1,833	7.44%	
MSCP	Tenshubam Bheigyachandra Shamuphaba	161	0.65%	
Margin of victory		603	2.45%	−17.69%
Turnout		24,630	89.64%	0.18%
Registered electors		27,476		3.68%
AITC gain from INC		Swing	-8.55%	

=== Assembly Election 2007 ===
2007 Manipur Legislative Assembly election: Thongju
Party	Candidate	Votes	%	±%
INC	Bijoy Koijam	11,941	50.36%	46.90%
Independent	Thokchom Ajit Singh	7,167	30.23%	
SP	Dr. Sapam Dhananjoy	4,600	19.40%	
Margin of victory		4,774	20.14%	11.77%
Turnout		23,709	89.46%	−2.60%
Registered electors		26,502		13.30%
INC gain from MSCP		Swing	15.10%	

=== Assembly Election 2002 ===
2002 Manipur Legislative Assembly election: Thongju
Party	Candidate	Votes	%	±%
MSCP	Bijoy Koijam	7,510	35.26%	7.39%
NCP	Dr. Sapam Dhananjoy	5,729	26.90%	25.44%
DRPP	P. Premananda	4,103	19.26%	
FPM	Brajagopal Sharma	2,653	12.46%	−5.67%
INC	Seram Mangi Singh	738	3.46%	
BJP	Karamchand Singh	356	1.67%	−4.48%
JD(U)	M. Ibobi Singh	210	0.99%	
Margin of victory		1,781	8.36%	1.75%
Turnout		21,299	92.06%	−2.00%
Registered electors		23,391		4.26%
MSCP hold		Swing	4.75%	

=== Assembly Election 2000 ===
2000 Manipur Legislative Assembly election: Thongju
Party	Candidate	Votes	%	±%
MSCP	Dr. Sapam Dhananjoy	5,790	27.87%	
Independent	Bijoy Koijam	4,416	21.26%	
FPM	Brajagopal Sharma	3,765	18.12%	16.88%
JD(S)	Th. Chatukini Singh	2,243	10.80%	
JD(U)	Nameirakpam Irabanta	1,706	8.21%	
BJP	N. Ibotombi Singh	1,279	6.16%	−7.53%
MPP	Akoijam Sanaton	980	4.72%	−25.79%
NCP	Thoudam Joykumar Singh	303	1.46%	
SAP	N. Debendro Singh	293	1.41%	−0.75%
Margin of victory		1,374	6.61%	2.48%
Turnout		20,775	93.32%	−0.74%
Registered electors		22,436		8.97%
MSCP gain from MPP		Swing	-2.64%	

=== Assembly Election 1995 ===
1995 Manipur Legislative Assembly election: Thongju
Party	Candidate	Votes	%	±%
MPP	Dr. Sapam Dhananjoy	5,829	30.51%	
JD	Thingujam Chatukini	5,039	26.37%	
INC	Sanglakpam Brajagopal Sharma	3,602	18.85%	−29.61%
BJP	Thoudam Joykumar Singh	2,615	13.69%	
IC(S)	Thangsabam Budhi	1,282	6.71%	
SAP	Oinam Ganga Singh	413	2.16%	
FPM	Hijam Heramot	238	1.25%	
Margin of victory		790	4.13%	1.05%
Turnout		19,106	94.06%	1.72%
Registered electors		20,590		−3.23%
MPP gain from JD		Swing	-21.03%	

=== Assembly Election 1990 ===
1990 Manipur Legislative Assembly election: Thongju
Party	Candidate	Votes	%	±%
JD	Thoudam Krishna Singh	9,956	51.54%	
INC	Leitanthem Toma	9,361	48.46%	33.46%
Margin of victory		595	3.08%	−12.13%
Turnout		19,317	92.34%	1.66%
Registered electors		21,277		36.09%
JD gain from Independent		Swing	18.90%	

=== Assembly Election 1984 ===
1984 Manipur Legislative Assembly election: Thongju
Party	Candidate	Votes	%	±%
Independent	Nameirakpam Bisheshwor	4,517	32.64%	
MPP	Waikhom Tolen	2,412	17.43%	−1.42%
INC	Shanglakpam Brajagopal Sharma	2,076	15.00%	
Independent	Thoudam Joykumar Singh	1,367	9.88%	
JP	Thokchom Kunjo Singh	1,314	9.49%	
Independent	Hijam Heramot	710	5.13%	
IC(S)	Seram Ango Singh	676	4.88%	
Independent	Thangsabam Budhi	463	3.35%	
Independent	Nongmeikapam Chaoba	203	1.47%	
Margin of victory		2,105	15.21%	7.52%
Turnout		13,840	90.67%	5.65%
Registered electors		15,635		6.81%
Independent hold		Swing	6.10%	

=== Assembly Election 1980 ===
1980 Manipur Legislative Assembly election: Thongju
Party	Candidate	Votes	%	±%
Independent	Oinam Tomba	3,241	26.53%	
MPP	Waikhom Tolen	2,302	18.85%	−3.35%
Independent	Thoudam Joykumar Singh	1,159	9.49%	
Independent	Seram Ango Singh	1,032	8.45%	
Independent	Mayengbam Ibobi	1,009	8.26%	
JP	Hijam Haramot	971	7.95%	
JP(S)	Thakehom Kunjo	770	6.30%	
INC(U)	Atom Ibetombi	706	5.78%	
Independent	Nongthombam Dhabal	575	4.71%	
INC(I)	Hawaibam Shyama Singh	423	3.46%	
Margin of victory		939	7.69%	3.45%
Turnout		12,215	85.03%	−4.26%
Registered electors		14,638		20.69%
Independent gain from Socialist Party (India)		Swing	-5.27%	

=== Assembly Election 1974 ===
1974 Manipur Legislative Assembly election: Thongju
Party	Candidate	Votes	%	±%
Socialist Party (India)	Hawaibam Shyama Singh	3,385	31.80%	
INC	Oinam Tomba Singh	2,934	27.57%	3.85%
MPP	Mayengbam Ibobi Singh	2,362	22.19%	−24.62%
Independent	Seram Ango Singh	1,962	18.43%	
Margin of victory		451	4.24%	−18.86%
Turnout		10,643	89.29%	8.54%
Registered electors		12,129		12.02%
Socialist Party (India) gain from MPP		Swing	-15.00%	

=== Assembly Election 1972 ===
1972 Manipur Legislative Assembly election: Thongju
Party	Candidate	Votes	%	±%
MPP	Oinam Tomba Singh	4,027	46.81%	
INC	Kshetrimayum Muhori Singh	2,040	23.71%	−12.25%
Socialist Party (India)	Hawaibam Shyama Singh	2,037	23.68%	
CPI	Thokchom Goursing	499	5.80%	
Margin of victory		1,987	23.10%	21.37%
Turnout		8,603	80.75%	−2.60%
Registered electors		10,828		−29.86%
MPP gain from INC		Swing	10.84%	

=== Assembly Election 1967 ===
1967 Manipur Legislative Assembly election: Thongju
Party	Candidate	Votes	%	±%
INC	S. A. Singh	4,465	35.97%	
SSP	H. S. Singh	4,251	34.24%	
Independent	Suleiman	2,017	16.25%	
Independent	T. T. Singh	741	5.97%	
PSP	M. G. Singh	463	3.73%	
Independent	T. K. Singh	261	2.10%	
Independent	U. M. Singh	177	1.43%	
Margin of victory		214	1.72%	
Turnout		12,414	83.35%	
Registered electors		15,437		
INC win (new seat)				

== See also ==
- Imphal East district
- Manipur Legislative Assembly
- List of constituencies of Manipur Legislative Assembly
