= Vandre West Assembly constituency =

Constituency of the Maharashtra legislative assembly in India

Coordinates: 19.055°N 72.831°E

Vandre West
- Constituency No. 177 for the Maharashtra Legislative Assembly

Constituency details
- Country: India
- Region: Western India
- State: Maharashtra
- District: Mumbai Suburban
- Lok Sabha constituency: Mumbai North Central
- Established: 2008
- Total electors: 288,753
- Reservation: None

Member of Legislative Assembly
- 15th Maharashtra Legislative Assembly
- Incumbent Ashish Shelar
- Party: Bharatiya Janata Party
- Alliance: Mahayuti
- Elected year: 2024

Vandre West Assembly constituency is one of the 288 Vidhan Sabha constituencies of Maharashtra state in western India, since 2008. Vandre, also known as Bandra, is a suburb of Mumbai. Before the 2008 delimitation of assembly seats, this seat's area was covered under Vandre Assembly constituency, represented by Ramdas Nayak among others.

== Overview ==
Vandre West (constituency number 177) is one of the 26 Vidhan Sabha constituencies located in the Mumbai Suburban district.

Vandre West is part of Mumbai North Central Lok Sabha constituency along with five other Vidhan Sabha segments in Mumbai Suburban district, namely Vile Parle, Chandivali, Kurla, Kalina and Vandre East.

== Members of the Legislative Assembly ==
Year	Member	Party
Known as Vandre
1957	Purushottam Ganesh Kher	Indian National Congress
1962	Purushottam Ganesh Kher	Indian National Congress
1967	Purushottam Ganesh Kher	Indian National Congress
1972	Jorge D. Souza	Indian National Congress
1978	Varde Sadanand Shankar	Janata Party
1980	Ahmed B. Zakaria	Indian National Congress (I)
1985	Qureshi Shamim Rashid	Indian National Congress
1990	Salim Zakaria	Indian National Congress
1995	Jayashree Ramdas Nayak	Bharatiya Janata Party
1999	Baba Siddique	Indian National Congress
2004	Baba Siddique	Indian National Congress
Until 2008: See Vandre
2009	Baba Siddique	Indian National Congress
2014	Ashish Shelar	Bharatiya Janata Party
2019	Ashish Shelar	Bharatiya Janata Party
2024	Ashish Shelar	Bharatiya Janata Party

== Election results ==
=== Assembly Election 2024 ===
2024 Maharashtra Legislative Assembly election : Vandre West
Party	Candidate	Votes	%	±%
BJP	Ashish Shelar	82,780	56.14%	▼2.55
INC	Asif Ahmed Zakaria	62,849	42.62%	▲4.73
NOTA	None of the Above	1,678	1.14%	▼1.63
Margin of victory		19,931	13.52%	▼7.28
Turnout		149,132	51.65%	▲7.64
Total valid votes		147,454		
Registered electors		288,753		▼3.01
BJP hold		Swing	▼2.55	

=== Assembly Election 2019 ===
2019 Maharashtra Legislative Assembly election : Vandre West
Party	Candidate	Votes	%	±%
BJP	Ashish Shelar	74,816	58.69%	▲7.22
INC	Asif Ahmed Zakaria	48,309	37.90%	▲4.95
NOTA	None of the Above	3,531	2.77%	▲1.71
VBA	Istiyak Bashir Jagirdar	3,312	2.60%	New
BSP	Arun Vitthal Jadhav	1,036	0.81%	▲0.09
Margin of victory		26,507	20.79%	▲2.27
Turnout		131,014	44.01%	▼6.69
Total valid votes		127,473		
Registered electors		297,716		▲3.87
BJP hold		Swing	▲7.22	

=== Assembly Election 2014 ===
2014 Maharashtra Legislative Assembly election : Vandre West
Party	Candidate	Votes	%	±%
BJP	Ashish Shelar	74,779	51.47%	▲6.27
INC	Baba Siddique	47,868	32.95%	▼13.57
SS	Chawri Vilas Sitaram	14,156	9.74%	New
MNS	Tushar Madhav Aphale	3,116	2.14%	New
NCP	Asif Bhamla	2,387	1.64%	New
NOTA	None of the Above	1,535	1.06%	New
Independent	Adv. Shane Cardoz	1,197	0.82%	New
BSP	Amar Krishna Chafe	1,053	0.72%	▼0.25
Margin of victory		26,911	18.52%	▲17.20
Turnout		146,834	51.23%	▲7.65
Total valid votes		145,295		
Registered electors		286,621		▼3.79
BJP gain from INC		Swing	▲4.95	

=== Assembly Election 2009 ===
2009 Maharashtra Legislative Assembly election : Vandre West
Party	Candidate	Votes	%	±%
INC	Baba Siddique	59,659	46.52%	New
BJP	Ashish Shelar	57,968	45.20%	New
Independent	Khan Rahebar (Raja)	5,132	4.00%	New
SP	Rizwan Merchant	1,862	1.45%	New
BSP	Tejpal Singh Chadha	1,248	0.97%	New
Independent	Shah Bharat Meghji	933	0.73%	New
Independent	Lokre Nisar Mohammed Salim	863	0.67%	New
Margin of victory		1,691	1.32%	
Turnout		128,246	43.05%	
Total valid votes		128,245		
Registered electors		297,919		
INC win (new seat)				

== See also ==
- Bandra
- List of constituencies of Maharashtra Vidhan Sabha
