= Varun Sardesai =

Indian politician

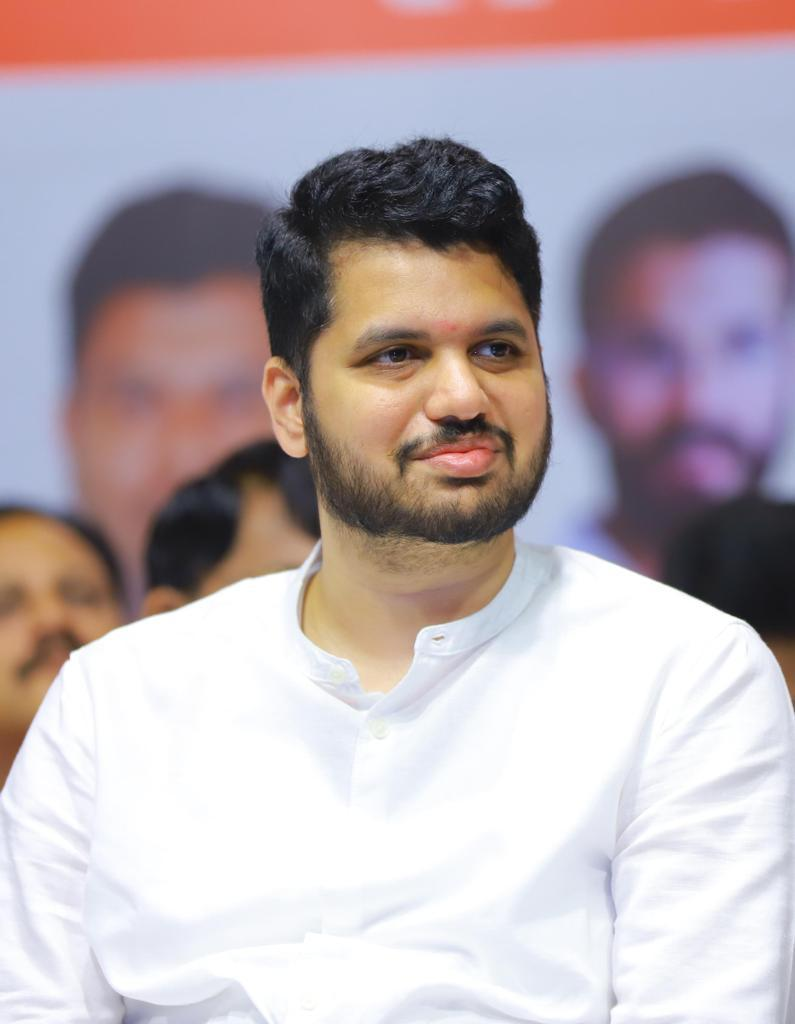

Secretary of Yuva Sena

Member of the Maharashtra Legislative Assembly
- Incumbent
- Assumed office 23 November 2024
- Preceded by: Zeeshan Siddique
- Constituency: Vandre East

Personal details
- Born: 23 September 1992 (age 34) Dombivli, India
- Party: Shiv Sena (Uddhav Balasaheb Thackeray); Shiv Sena
- Education: Columbia University Datta Meghe College of Engineering
- Profession: Politician

Varun Satish Sardesai (born 23 September 1992) is a Shiv Sena (UBT) politician from Maharashtra, who is serving as a Member of Legislative Assembly from the Vandre (Bandra) East constituency. He is the Secretary of Yuva Sena, the youth wing of Shiv Sena and Secretary of Shiv Sena (UBT).

== Early life ==
Sardesai was born to Satish Sardesai and Swati Sardesai (née Patankar) on 23 September 1992 in Dombivli. He completed his schooling from Abhinav Vidyalaya, Dombivli. Sardesai graduated with a Bachelors in Engineering (Civil Engineering) degree from Datta Meghe College of Engineering, Airoli, Navi Mumbai in 2014. He later obtained his master's degree from Columbia University, New York, an Ivy League institution where he earned his MS in Construction Management in 2015. He worked as a Project Manager with a construction firm in New York for a year after his degree. He is an avid basketball player, representing the state at various competitions.

== Political career ==
Sardesai began his political journey in 2011, representing students in college as the Head of Yuva Sena. In 2013, he was appointed the General Secretary of the Association of Civil Engineering Students (ACES) at Datta Meghe College. He was elevated as the Secretary of Yuva Sena in 2018, a post he retains till date. He was named as the star campaigner for Lok Sabha and assembly polls in 2019. He was also appointed as the Secretary of Shiv Sena (UBT) in 2023. In November 2024, Sardesai contested the 2024 Maharashtra Legislative Assembly election from the Vandre(Bandra) East constituency in Mumbai against NCP candidate and former MLA Zeeshan Siddique and subsequently emerged victorious. As an MLA, he is a member of the Assurances Committee and the Committee for Public Undertakings (COPU).

Over the past few years, Sardesai has spearheaded several high-profile protests, solidifying his position as a powerful voice within the party. One of Sardesai's most defining moments came in April 2023 when he spearheaded a major protest against Independent MP Navneet Rana and MLA Ravi Rana. The couple had challenged the Thackerays by threatening to recite the Hanuman Chalisa outside Matoshree. In response, Sardesai swiftly organized thousands of Sainiks to stage a 48-hour protest outside the Ranas’ Khar residence, ultimately pressuring them to withdraw. The episode demonstrated his capacity to mobilize the party's base during high-pressure situations.

Sardesai also led a vociferous protest outside Union Minister Narayan Rane’s home following his derogatory comments about Shiv Sena chief Uddhav Thackeray.

Beyond the spotlight, Sardesai has long shaped Yuva Sena's political and electoral strategy. He has been pivotal in planning electoral campaigns, handling data, and overseeing internal party surveys—contributing significantly to the party's electoral successes. He played a key role for the party during the Kalyan-Dombivali civic polls.

The Yuva Sena swept the Mumbai University Senate polls in 2024 winning all 10 graduate seats, defeating Akhil Bharatiya Vidyarthi Sena, the student wing of the RSS. Sardesai has been hailed as the architect of the massive victory.
