= G. Steephen =

Indian politician (born 1969)

Adv. G. Steephen
- അഡ്വ. ജി. സ്റ്റീഫൻ

Member of the Kerala Legislative Assembly for Aruvikkara
- Incumbent
- Assumed office 20 May 2021
- Constituency: Aruvikkara
- Preceded by: K. S. Sabarinathan

Personal details
- Born: 24 July 1969 (age 57) Kattakkada, Thiruvananthapuram
- Party: Communist Party of India (Marxist)
- Education: Kerala Law Academy

G. Steephen (born 24 July 1969) is an Indian politician belonging to the CPI(M). He represents Aruvikkara in the Kerala Legislative Assembly. In the 2021 elections, he defeated the incumbent MLA K. S. Sabarinadhan by a margin of 5046 votes.
