= Ashish Shelar =

Indian politician

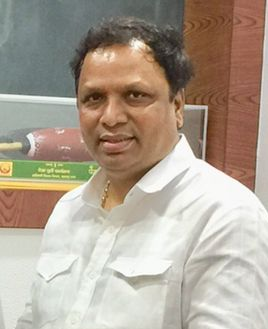

Minister of Information Technology Government of Maharashtra
- Incumbent
- Assumed office 15 December 2024
- Chief Minister: Devendra Fadnavis
- Preceded by: Eknath Shinde

Minister of Cultural Affairs Government of Maharashtra
- Incumbent
- Assumed office 15 December 2024
- Chief Minister: Devendra Fadnavis
- Preceded by: Sudhir Mungantiwar

Minister of School Education Government of Maharashtra
- In office 16 June 2019 – 12 November 2019
- Chief Minister: Devendra Fadnavis
- Preceded by: Vinod Tawde
- Succeeded by: Varsha Gaikwad

Member of Maharashtra Legislative Assembly
- Incumbent
- Assumed office 2014
- Preceded by: Baba Siddique
- Constituency: Vandre West

Member of Maharashtra Legislative Council
- In office 28 July 2012 – 27 October 2014
- Succeeded by: Mahadev Jankar
- Constituency: elected by Legislative Assembly members

President of Bharatiya Janata Party – Mumbai
- In office 12 August 2022 – 25 August 2025
- President: Chandrashekhar Bawankule
- Preceded by: Mangal Lodha
- Succeeded by: Ameet Satam
- In office 10 June 2013 – 16 July 2019
- President: Devendra Fadnavis; Raosaheb Danve
- Preceded by: Raj K. Purohit
- Succeeded by: Mangal Lodha

Personal details
- Born: 3 October 1972 (age 54) Sindhudurg district, Maharashtra, India
- Party: Bharatiya Janata Party
- Spouse: Pratima Shelar
- Children: Omkar Shelar
- Education: G.J Advani College Mumbai LLB; University of Mumbai
- Occupation: Politician
- Website: www.mumbaibjp.org

Ashish Shelar (born 3 October 1972) is an Indian politician and cricket administrator belonging to Bharatiya Janata Party. He served as Maharashtra Legislative Assembly member representing Vandre West since 2014. He is president of the Mumbai unit of the BJP. He was elected as vice president of Mumbai Cricket Association on 17 June 2015. Elected as treasurer of the BCCI. On 9 September 2015, Shelar gained controversy when he helped ban the sale of meat for 8 days for the annual Jain celebration, Paryushana, at which time total fast from any and every food is required. Most constituencies in Maharashtra ban the sale of meat for only 4 days. The ban was criticized by the BJP's Maharashtra coalition partner, Shiv Sena.

== Education and early career ==
Shelar graduated from Parle College with a Bachelor of Science (B.Sc.) degree in 1992. He then completed a three-year law degree from G. J. Advani Law College, at the University of Mumbai.

A native from Sindhudurg district of Konkan, Ashish was born in chawl system dwelling of mill-workers area. Later in his childhood he shifted and settled in Bandra West with his parents and family. He joined RSS in school days and completed Prathamik Varga course. He went on to join ABVP in college and successfully rose to the leading position of Mumbai Secretary of ABVP.

Ashish is a member of the Rashtriya Swayamsevak Sangh (RSS), Since his Childhood a Hindu volunteer organisation that works for social upliftment.

== Family and personal life ==
Ashish Shelar is married to advocate Pratima Shelar (née Dalvi).

== Sports administration ==
- Elected Mumbai Cricket Association member in June 2015.
- Chairman of Mumbai district football association representing Mumbai's 350 football clubs.
- Vice President of the Rajasthan Sports Club.
- Elected Mumbai Cricket Association President on 12 January 2017.

== Positions held ==
=== Within BJP ===
- Mumbai Secretary, ABVP
- President, Mumbai BJYM
- Core team, organising committee, BJP Maha Adhiveshan, 1995
- BMC Corporator, Khar West
- President, North West Mumbai district BJP
- BMC Corporator, BJP Group Leader in BMC
- MMRDA member
- Governor of Mumbai Metro heritage society.
- Currently President Bharatiya Janata Party, Mumbai.

=== Legislative ===
- Member, Maharashtra Legislative Council, 28 July 2012 – 27 July 2014
- Member, Maharashtra Legislative Assembly, Since 2014
