= Vandré =

Vandré may refer to:

- Vandré Sagrilo Monteiro, (born 1979), a Brazilian footballer
- Geraldo Vandré (born 1935), a Brazilian singer, composer and guitar player
- Vandré, Charente-Maritime, a commune in western France

== See also ==
- Vandre (disambiguation)
