= Kherwadi Assembly constituency =

Former constituency of the Maharashtra legislative assembly in India

Coordinates: 19.06°N 72.84°E

Kherwadi
- Former constituency for the Maharashtra Legislative Assembly

Constituency details
- Country: India
- Region: Western India
- State: Maharashtra
- Established: 1978
- Abolished: 2008

Kherwadi was one of the constituencies of the Maharashtra Legislative Assembly, in India. It was made defunct after the constituency map of India was redrawn in 2008.

== Members of Vidhan Sabha ==
| Year | Member | Party |
|---|---|---|
| 1978 | Ramdas Nayak | Janata Party |
| 1980 | Chheda Meghaji | Indian National Congress (I) |
| 1985 | Janardan Chandurkar | Indian National Congress |
| 1990 | Madhukar Sarpotdar | Shiv Sena |
| 1995 | Madhukar Sarpotdar | Shiv Sena |
| 1996 By-election | Shrikant Krishnaji Sarmalkar | Shiv Sena |
| 1999 | Janardan Chandurkar | Indian National Congress |
| 2004 | Janardan Chandurkar | Indian National Congress |
See After 2008: Vandre East

== Election results ==
=== Assembly Election 2004 ===
2004 Maharashtra Legislative Assembly election : Kherwadi
| Party | Candidate | Votes | % | ±% |
|---|---|---|---|---|
| INC | Janardan Chandurkar | 50,157 | 50.04% | ▲8.11 |
| SS | Prakash(Bala) Vasant Sawant | 43,609 | 43.51% | ▲4.18 |
| SP | K. H. Giri | 2,333 | 2.33% | New |
| BSP | Khan Shamim | 1,736 | 1.73% | ▲0.91 |
| Independent | Shaikh Tanveer Ahmed | 978 | 0.98% | New |
| Independent | Gaikwad Pramod Ramchandra | 604 | 0.60% | New |
| Margin of victory | | 6,548 | 6.53% | ▲3.93 |
| Turnout | | 1,00,233 | 50.49% | ▲4.19 |
| Total valid votes | | 1,00,233 | | |
| Registered electors | | 1,98,529 | | ▼0.32 |
| INC hold | | Swing | ▲8.11 | |

=== Assembly Election 1999 ===
1999 Maharashtra Legislative Assembly election : Kherwadi
| Party | Candidate | Votes | % | ±% |
|---|---|---|---|---|
| INC | Janardan Chandurkar | 37,936 | 41.94% | ▼2.09 |
| SS | Shrikant Krishnaji Sarmalkar | 35,577 | 39.33% | ▼13.00 |
| NCP | Vijay Kamble | 15,130 | 16.73% | New |
| BSP | Bandu Laxman Kasare | 745 | 0.82% | New |
| Margin of victory | | 2,359 | 2.61% | ▼5.70 |
| Turnout | | 92,213 | 46.30% | ▲8.77 |
| Total valid votes | | 90,463 | | |
| Registered electors | | 1,99,171 | | ▲4.94 |
| INC gain from SS | | Swing | ▼10.40 | |

=== Assembly By-election 1996 ===
1996 Maharashtra Legislative Assembly by-election : Kherwadi
| Party | Candidate | Votes | % | ±% |
|---|---|---|---|---|
| SS | Shrikant Krishnaji Sarmalkar | 37,272 | 52.33% | ▲3.40 |
| INC | Kamble Vijay Baburao | 31,355 | 44.02% | ▲12.52 |
| RPI | Bapuji Sitaram Ramteke | 1,098 | 1.54% | New |
| AIMF | Khan Rais Khan | 677 | 0.95% | New |
| Independent | Madhav Deshpande | 467 | 0.66% | New |
| Margin of victory | | 5,917 | 8.31% | ▼9.13 |
| Turnout | | 71,932 | 37.90% | ▼26.25 |
| Total valid votes | | 71,224 | | |
| Registered electors | | 1,89,797 | | ▲7.74 |
| SS hold | | Swing | ▲3.40 | |

=== Assembly Election 1995 ===
1995 Maharashtra Legislative Assembly election : Kherwadi
| Party | Candidate | Votes | % | ±% |
|---|---|---|---|---|
| SS | Madhukar Sarpotdar | 54,978 | 48.93% | ▲3.25 |
| INC | Kamble Vijay Baburao | 35,390 | 31.50% | ▼13.33 |
| JD | Shaila Satpute | 10,504 | 9.35% | New |
| BSP | Ashok Prabhakar Patil | 6,767 | 6.02% | New |
| PDP | Sayed Sipte Haider | 2,558 | 2.28% | New |
| Independent | Adangale Rajendra Nivrutti | 1,103 | 0.98% | New |
| Margin of victory | | 19,588 | 17.43% | ▲16.59 |
| Turnout | | 1,14,062 | 64.75% | ▲6.90 |
| Total valid votes | | 1,12,350 | | |
| Registered electors | | 1,76,168 | | ▲7.07 |
| SS hold | | Swing | ▲3.25 | |

=== Assembly Election 1990 ===
1990 Maharashtra Legislative Assembly election : Kherwadi
| Party | Candidate | Votes | % | ±% |
|---|---|---|---|---|
| SS | Madhukar Sarpotdar | 42,742 | 45.68% | New |
| INC | Kamble Vijay Baburao | 41,948 | 44.83% | ▲10.62 |
| CPI | Jagtap Sitaram Ramchandra | 3,684 | 3.94% | New |
| Independent | Janardan Chandurkar | 2,078 | 2.22% | New |
| DMM | Nanyiyani Ali Husein | 1,412 | 1.51% | New |
| Independent | Indrakant P. Jha | 901 | 0.96% | New |
| Margin of victory | | 794 | 0.85% | ▼6.16 |
| Turnout | | 94,466 | 57.42% | ▲4.53 |
| Total valid votes | | 93,568 | | |
| Registered electors | | 1,64,529 | | ▲22.42 |
| SS gain from INC | | Swing | ▲11.47 | |

=== Assembly Election 1985 ===
1985 Maharashtra Legislative Assembly election : Kherwadi
| Party | Candidate | Votes | % | ±% |
|---|---|---|---|---|
| INC | Janardan Chandurkar | 24,063 | 34.21% | New |
| Independent | Madhukar Sarpotdar | 19,135 | 27.20% | New |
| BJP | Ramdas Nayak | 13,583 | 19.31% | ▼16.57 |
| Independent | Upadhyay Ramanuj | 7,293 | 10.37% | New |
| Independent | Habib Pakih | 4,385 | 6.23% | New |
| Independent | Dayal Sakpal (Mumurshikar) | 1,104 | 1.57% | New |
| Margin of victory | | 4,928 | 7.01% | ▼0.84 |
| Turnout | | 71,094 | 52.90% | ▲12.90 |
| Total valid votes | | 70,340 | | |
| Registered electors | | 1,34,397 | | ▲6.48 |
| INC gain from INC(I) | | Swing | ▼9.51 | |

=== Assembly Election 1980 ===
1980 Maharashtra Legislative Assembly election : Kherwadi
| Party | Candidate | Votes | % | ±% |
|---|---|---|---|---|
| INC(I) | Chheda Meghaji | 21,765 | 43.72% | New |
| BJP | Ramdas Nayak | 17,861 | 35.88% | New |
| INC(U) | Kanire Ramchandra Annaji | 4,296 | 8.63% | New |
| JP | G. R. Nayak | 3,680 | 7.39% | ▼43.60 |
| Independent | R. S. Meshram | 1,146 | 2.30% | New |
| CPI | Jagtap Sitaram Ramchandra | 929 | 1.87% | ▼0.57 |
| Margin of victory | | 3,904 | 7.84% | ▼18.47 |
| Turnout | | 50,373 | 39.91% | ▼26.02 |
| Total valid votes | | 49,781 | | |
| Registered electors | | 1,26,215 | | ▲14.32 |
| INC(I) gain from JP | | Swing | ▼7.27 | |

=== Assembly Election 1978 ===
1978 Maharashtra Legislative Assembly election : Kherwadi
| Party | Candidate | Votes | % | ±% |
|---|---|---|---|---|
| JP | Ramdas Nayak | 36,851 | 50.99% | New |
| INC | Ahmed B. Zakaria | 17,834 | 24.68% | New |
| RPI | R. G. Ruke | 8,200 | 11.35% | New |
| SS | Madhukar Sarpotdar | 6,228 | 8.62% | New |
| CPI | Sitaram Ramchandra Jagtap | 1,762 | 2.44% | New |
| Independent | Shivrao Shantaram Wagle | 1,170 | 1.62% | New |
| Margin of victory | | 19,017 | 26.31% | |
| Turnout | | 73,559 | 66.63% | |
| Total valid votes | | 72,271 | | |
| Registered electors | | 1,10,405 | | |
| JP win (new seat) | | | | |

== See also ==
- List of constituencies of Maharashtra Legislative Assembly
