= Amol Mitkari =

Indian social activist and Politician

Member of Maharashtra Legislative Council
- In office 14 May 2020 – 13 May 2026
- Succeeded by: Zeeshan Siddique
- Constituency: Elected by MLAs

Personal details
- Born: Amol Ramkrushna Mitkari; 1982 (age 43–44) Kutasa, Akola district, Maharashtra, India
- Party: Nationalist Congress Party (Ajit Pawar)
- Spouse: Kavita Mitkari
- Children: 2 (1 daughter, 1 son)
- Parent: Ramkrushna Bhimappa Mitkari (father)
- Education: BA
- Alma mater: Yashwantrao Chavan Maharashtra Open University

Amol Ramkrushna Mitkari (born 1982) is an Indian social activist, orator and politician belonging to the Nationalist Congress Party. He is member of Maharashtra Legislative Council and also served as member of Zilla Parishad. He got elected to the Legislative Council by MLA's unopposed on 24 May 2020, along with 9 others.

== Personal life ==
Amol Mitkari belongs to the Kutasa village, which falls in the middle of Amravati and Akola District. His father is a farmer and ran a grocery shop. He is married to Kavita Mitkari having one daughter named Apurva Mitkari. He has completed his graduation from Sant Gadge Baba Amravati University.

== Political career ==
Amol Mitkari started his career as a member of Sambhaji Brigade and was its spokesperson. He is now associated with the Nationalist Congress Party (NCP), as one of their top public speakers. He is state general secretary of NCP and was elected to the Maharashtra Legislative Council on 14 May 2020.

== Positions held ==
- Member of Maharashtra Legislative Council, 2020
- July 2023 Appointed party speaker of Nationalist Congress Party (Ajit Pawar) faction.
- Member of Maharashtra Legislative Council, 2023
