= M. Vijayakumar =

Indian politician

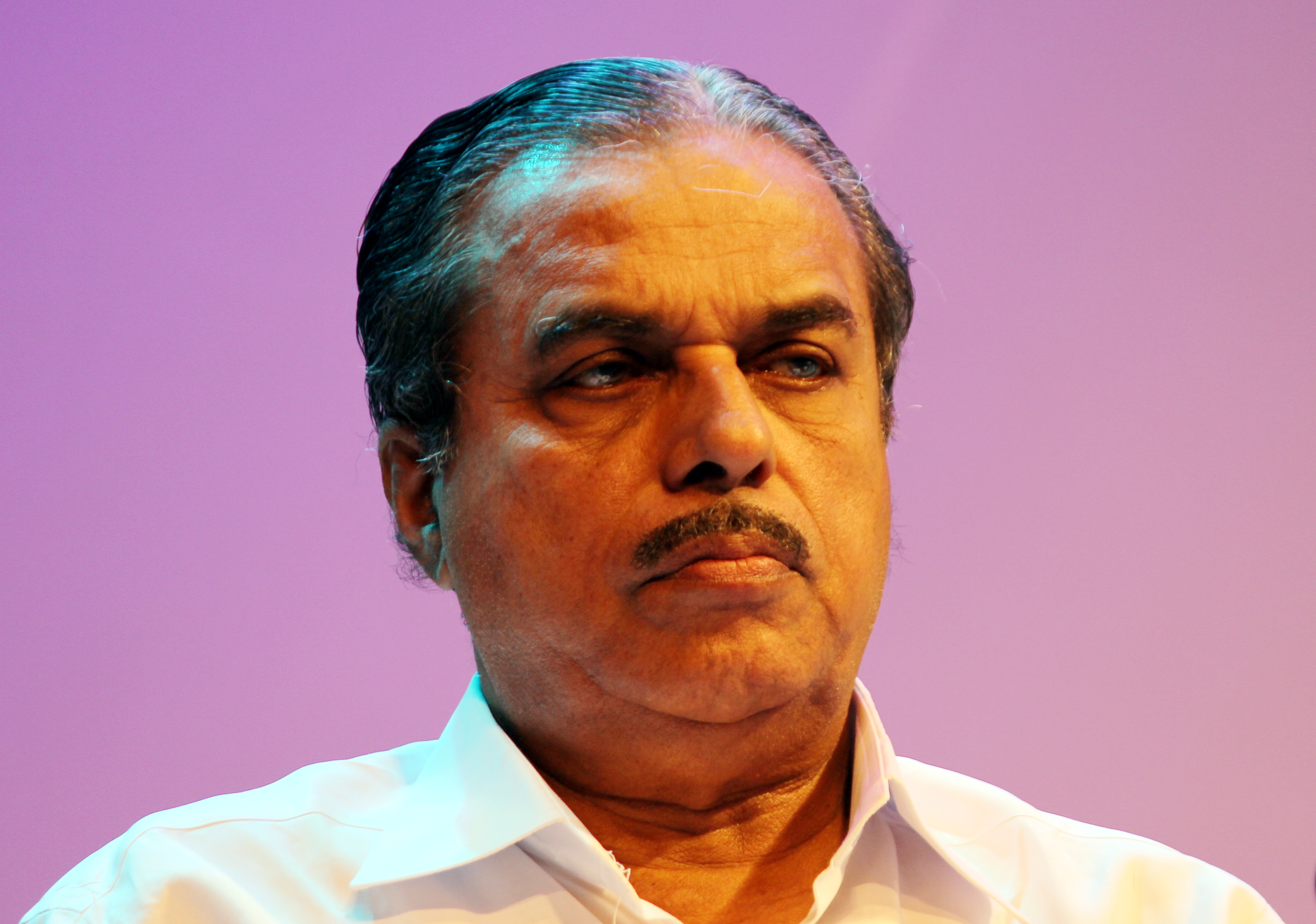

Minister for Law, Sports and Youth Affairs, Govt of Kerala
- In office 2006–2011
- Preceded by: K. M. Mani
- Succeeded by: K. M. Mani, P. K. Jayalakshmi

Speaker of Kerala Legislative assembly
- In office 1996–2001

Member of Legislative assembly
- In office 2006–2011
- Constituency: Thiruvananthapuram North, Thiruvananthapuram
- In office 1987–2001
- Constituency: Thiruvananthapuram North, Thiruvananthapuram

Personal details
- Born: 5 October 1950 (age 75) Nedumangad, Thiruvananthapuram district, Kerala, India
- Party: Communist Party of India (Marxist)
- Spouse: Sreekala
- Children: Aravind, Archana

M. Vijayakumar (born 5 October 1950) is an Indian politician who belongs to the CPI(M). He served as an MLA, minister, and Speaker in the Kerala Legislative Assembly. He has been on the State and Central Committee of CPI(M). As an MLA, he represented the erstwhile Thiruvananthapuram North constituency in the Assembly.

== Career ==
M. Vijayakumar was born on 5 October 1950 at Panacode near Nedumangad in Thiruvananthapuram district, Kerala. He holds a B.A. and Bachelor of Law (LL.B.) degree. He entered politics through students' movement and took active part in the formation of Students' Federation of India (SFI) in 1970 and Democratic Youth Federation of India (DYFI) in 1980. During the course of his political career, he has served at different times as the Kerala State Secretary of the SFI, District Secretary & State Secretary of DYFI, All India President of the DYFI, and State Committee member of CPI (M).

Vijayakumar was arrested several times and beaten by the police during the emergency period. He was also jailed for four months at Poojappura Central Jail, Thiruvananthapuram during emergency. He led several agitations, including Parliament March in September, 1981 raising the slogan "Education for all and job for all" and in August, 1986 actively participated in the "way blockade" agitation for getting unemployment wages and recruitments to be made through Public Service Commission (PSC) and was brutally beaten by the police.

He was elected to Kerala Legislative Assembly in 1987, 1991 and 1996 and served as Speaker of 10th Kerala Legislative Assembly from 1996 to 2001, being the first speaker to complete his term. In 2001, he suffered defeat, but again won in 2006. In that chance, he became the state cabinet minister for law. In 2011, he did not contest elections. In 2015, he contested the by-elections from Aruvikkara, which fell vacant due to the death of former Speaker of Kerala Legislative Assembly G. Karthikeyan, who died in office, but got defeated by Karthikeyan's son K. S. Sabarinathan. Now he is residing at PHAS (Pattur Housing Accommodation Scheme of KSHB) at EMS Nagar, Pattur, Trivandrum.

He is presently the Chairman of Kerala Tourism Development Corporation (KTDC).

== See also ==
- List of Kerala ministers
