= Zeeshan Siddique =

Indian politician (born 1992)

Zeeshan Baba Siddique
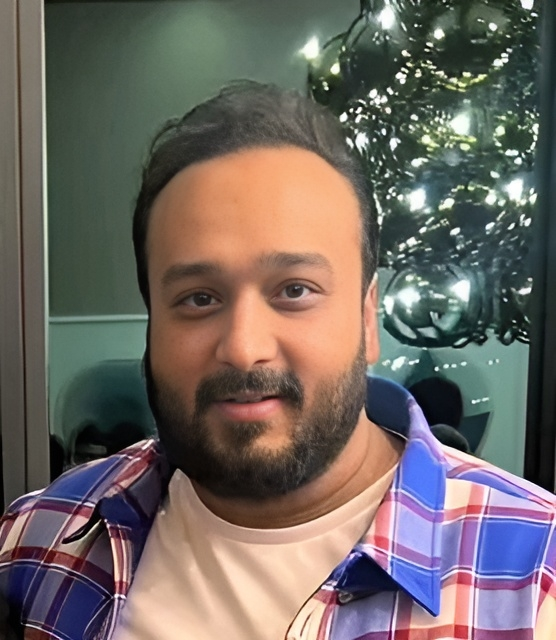
- Siddique in 2025

Member of Maharashtra Legislative Council
- Incumbent
- Assumed office 14 May 2026
- Preceded by: Amol Mitkari
- Constituency: Elected by MLAs

Member of Maharashtra Legislative Assembly
- In office 24 October 2019 – 23 November 2024
- Preceded by: Trupti Sawant
- Succeeded by: Varun Sardesai
- Constituency: Vandre East

President of Mumbai Regional Youth Congress
- In office 25 August 2021 – June 2024
- Preceded by: Ganesh Kumar Yadav
- Succeeded by: Varsha Gaikwad

Personal details
- Born: 3 October 1992 (age 34) Mumbai, Maharashtra, India
- Party: Nationalist Congress Party (2024-present)
- Other political affiliations: Indian National Congress (2019-2024)
- Parent: Baba Siddique (father)
- Education: M. M. K. College, University of Mumbai; Regent's University London, United Kingdom
- Profession: Politician

Zeeshan Baba Siddique (born 3 October 1992) is an Indian politician belonging to the Ajit Pawar-led Nationalist Congress Party . He is a former MLA in Maharashtra Legislative Assembly from Vandre East.

Siddique was expelled from Congress in August 2024 for cross-voting in the Maharashtra legislative council elections. He joined Ajit Pawar-led Nationalist Congress Party (NCP) on 25 October 2024.

== Personal life and education ==
Siddique was born on 3 October 1992 in Bandra, Mumbai, to late politician Baba Siddique and his wife Shehzeen Siddique. He has a sister Dr. Arshia Siddique who briefly joined politics before eventually becoming a doctor. Siddiqui graduated with a Bachelor of Management Studies from M. M. K. College, University of Mumbai in 2013. In July 2015, he completed his Master's degree in Global Management & Public Leadership at the Regent's University London, United Kingdom. On 12 October 2024, his father, who was a member of the Nationalist Congress Party, was shot dead at Siddique's office by unidentified assailants.

== Politics ==
In the 2019 Assembly elections, Siddique contested as a Congress candidate and won as a first term member of the Maharashtra Legislative Assembly representing the Vandre East constituency in Mumbai, which was earlier represented by his father. He garnered 38,337 votes by defeating Shiv Sena's Vishwanath Mahadeshwar who was the then mayor of Mumbai by a margin of 5,790 votes.

Siddique was expelled from Indian National Congress in August for cross-voting in the Maharashtra legislative council elections. He followed his father Baba Siddiqui in joining the Ajit Pawar led Nationalist Congress Party and was fielded from Vandre East in the 2024 Maharashtra Assembly elections. He received 46,343 votes and lost to Varun Sardesai of Shiv Sena (UBT) by a margin of 11,365 votes.

== Controversy ==
In May 2021, the Bombay High Court ordered a probe against Siddique and Sonu Sood regarding their procurement of Remdesivir drug for their charitable efforts during the pandemic.

== See also ==
- Baba Siddique
- Srinivas BV
