= Thongam Biswajit Singh =

Indian politician

Member of the Manipur Legislative Assembly
- Incumbent
- Assumed office March 2012
- Preceded by: Bijoy Koijam
- Constituency: Thongju

Minister For Environment, Forest and Climate Change and Power, Agriculture, Science & Technology Government of Manipur
- In office 2022–2025

Minister of Public Works, Rural Development and Panchayati Raj, Information and Public Relations, Administrative Reforms, Commerce and Industries Government of Manipur
- In office 2017–2022

Personal details
- Born: 1 February 1975 (age 51)
- Party: Bharatiya Janata Party
- Spouse: Thongam O Junreiwon
- Children: 3

Thongam Biswajit Singh is an Indian politician and member of the Bharatiya Janata Party (BJP). He is a member of the Manipur Legislative Assembly since 2012 from the Thongju constituency in Imphal East district. During the 2022 Legislative Assembly term, Singh was the Minister for Environment, Forest and Climate Change and Power, Agriculture, Science & Technology.

== Political career ==
=== 2012 Legislative Assembly ===
Biswajit Singh was elected as Trinamool Congress candidate in 2012 but resigned in 2015. He joined BJP after resigning and contested the by election as BJP candidate and won the election. From then till 2017, he was the lone BJP MLA in the state legislature.

=== 2017 Legislative Assembly ===
Prior to the 2017 election, Biswajit Singh is said to have been instrumental in bringing N. Biren Singh into the BJP from Indian National Congress. The BJP won 21 seats and had a majority in conjunction with alliance partners. Biswajit Singh was a strong contender for the chief minister (CM) post. But the BJP central leadership opted for Biren Singh as the chief minister.

Biswajit Singh was appointed as a cabinet minister in the first N. Biren Singh ministry, with a portfolio of a number of departments, including Public Works, Rural Development etc. By 2020, Biswajit Singh was counted as a dissenter. Biren Singh stripped all his portfolios as a cost-cutting measure. After a patch-up, they were restored but was said that the two were not on talking terms.

=== 2022 Legislative Assembly ===
Around the time of the 2022 election, there was again speculation that Biswajit Singh might be appointed as the CM after the election. But Biren Singh was again chosen as the CM, and Biswajit Singh was given a cabinet post, in charge of Power, Forest, Environment and Climate Change.

In October 2024, more than a year into the Manipur violence, Bishwajit Singh was mentioned as one among 19 BJP legislators that called for the change of chief minister. After the resignation of CM Biren Singh in February 2025, Bishwajit Singh was mentioned as one of the front-runners for his replacement. However, the state was put under President's Rule.
