= Bala Sawant =

Indian politician

Maharashtra Legislative Assembly
- In office 2009–2015
- Succeeded by: Trupti Sawant
- Constituency: Vandre East

Personal details
- Died: January 15, 2015 Bandra, Mumbai
- Citizenship: Indian
- Party: Shiv Sena
- Spouse: Trupti Sawant
- Occupation: Politician

Prakash Sawant (1950 – January 15, 2015), better known as Bala Sawant, was an Indian politician and a member of the Maharashtra Legislative Assembly & a senior Shiv Sena leader. He was first elected to the Assembly in the 2009 election to the Bandra East constituency. He died on 9 Jan 2015.

== Political career ==
Bala Sawant was first elected to the Bombay Municipal Corporation BMC as a corporator from Kherwadi in 1997. He served two more terms as a corporator in the BMC. He was re-elected to Vidhan Sabha as a Maharashtra Legislative Assembly in 2014. Sawant headed the BMC's law panel for two consecutive terms.

== Personal life ==
Bala Sawant was married to Trupti Sawant with whom he had a daughter. After his death his wife Trupti Sawant won the election from Bandra East constituency the seat he held and that was vacated after his death.

== Positions held ==
- Member of the Maharashtra Legislative Assembly 2009 & 2014
