= Ramdas Nayak =

Indian politician

Ramdas Nayak was a leader of Bharatiya Janata Party from Mumbai. He was shot dead on 25 August 1994 by Dawood's gang at the age of 52. He contested Vidhan Sabha elections 3-4 times with BJP, and served as a member of the Maharashtra Legislative Assembly from Kherwadi seat, near Bandra, in 1970s. He is best remembered for his 12-year-long private legal battle over the cement scandal which forced Antulay to resign as the state's chief minister.
