= G. Karthikeyan =

Indian politician (1949–2015)

Speaker of the Kerala Legislative Assembly
- In office 2 June 2011 – 7 March 2015
- Chief Minister: Oommen Chandy
- Preceded by: K. Radhakrishnan
- Succeeded by: N. Sakthan
- Constituency: Aruvikkara

Deputy Leader of the Opposition in the Kerala Legislative Assembly
- In office 2006–2011

Minister for Food and Civil Supplies, Government of Kerala
- In office 2001–2004
- Chief Minister: A. K. Antony
- Preceded by: E. Chandrasekharan Nair
- Succeeded by: Adoor Prakash

Minister for Electricity, Government of Kerala
- In office 1995–1996
- Chief Minister: A. K. Antony
- Preceded by: C. V. Padmarajan
- Succeeded by: Pinarayi Vijayan

Personal details
- Born: 20 January 1949 Varkala, Kerala
- Died: 7 March 2015 (aged 66) Bengaluru, Karnataka, India
- Party: Indian National Congress
- Spouse: Dr. M. T. Sulekha
- Children: 2 (incl. K. S. Sabarinadhan)
- Parent(s): N. P. Gopala Pillai; Vanajakshi Amma
- As of 7 March, 2015 Source: kerala.gov.in

Gopala Pillai Karthikeyan (20 January 1949 – 7 March 2015) was an Indian politician and former speaker of the Kerala Legislative Assembly. He was a Member of the Legislative Assembly from Aruvikkara constituency, who represented the Indian National Congress.

== Early life ==
Born on January 20, 1949, in Kannambayil, Varkala, Thiruvananthapuram district, the eldest son of N.P. Gopala Pillai and Vanajakshi Amma. He has seven siblings.

== Political life ==
G. Karthikeyan entered politics through student movements and was a leader of Kerala Students Union (KSU). He held a Bachelor of Laws degree. He served as the State president of Kerala Students Union. He was a Student member of senate of Kerala University and Secretary of Kerala University Union. He also held various posts in Youth Congress, including State General Secretary and State President. He was the general secretary of Kerala Pradesh Congress Committee (KPCC). Karthikeyan was the only elected Vice President of KPCC and also served as the Chief Whip and Deputy Leader of the Congress Legislature Party. He served as Minister for Electricity (Government of Kerala) in the Ministry headed by Shri A.K. Antony in 1995 and was the Minister for Food and Civil Supplies in the A.K. Antony Ministry in 2001. He was also an A.I.C.C. Member.

G Karthikeyan was elected as an MLA to the Kerala Legislative Assembly in 1982 (Trivandrum North), 1991, 1996, 2001 and 2006 (Aryanad) and in 2011 (Aruvikkara). He was elected as the speaker of Kerala Legislative Assembly in 2011, succeeding K. Radhakrishnan. He died on 7 March 2015, aged 66, at Health Care Global (H.C.G.) hospital in Bangalore, after suffering from serious complications of liver cancer. He was the second Speaker to die in office, after K. M. Seethi in 1961, and the first to die during a legislative session. He is survived by his wife and children.

Major Election Victories
Year	Constituency	Closest rival	Majority (votes)
1982	Trivandrum North	K. Anirudhan (CPI(M))	8,846
1991	Aryanad	K. Pankajakshan (RSP)	3,480
1996	Aryanad	K.P Sankaradas (RSP)	8,617
2001	Aryanad	G. Arjunan (RSP)	12,071
2006	Aryanad	T.J Chandrachoodan (RSP)	2,198
2011	Aruvikkara	Sreedharan Nair (RSP)	10,674
