= Vandre, Bhiwandi =

Village in Maharashtra

Vandre Vandra
- village
- Location in Maharashtra, India Vandre (India)
- Coordinates: 19.35050537°N 73.19920063°E
- Country: India
- State: Maharashtra
- District: Thane
- Taluka: Bhiwandi
- Elevation: 17 m (56 ft)

Population (2011)
  - Total: 1,182
- Time zone: UTC+5:30 (IST)
- 2011 census code: 552622

Vandre is a village in the Thane district of Maharashtra, India. It is located in the Bhiwandi taluka.

== Demographics ==
According to the 2011 census of India, Vandre has 239 households. The effective literacy rate (i.e. the literacy rate of population excluding children aged 6 and below) is 81.27%.

Demographics (2011 Census)
	Total	Male	Female
Population	1182	626	556
Children aged below 6 years	162	94	68
Scheduled caste	81	44	37
Scheduled tribe	88	43	45
Literates	829	490	339
Workers (all)	366	296	70
Main workers (total)	305	269	36
Main workers: Cultivators	58	54	4
Main workers: Agricultural labourers	61	48	13
Main workers: Household industry workers	5	3	2
Main workers: Other	181	164	17
Marginal workers (total)	61	27	34
Marginal workers: Cultivators	4	2	2
Marginal workers: Agricultural labourers	31	12	19
Marginal workers: Household industry workers	8	5	3
Marginal workers: Others	18	8	10
Non-workers	816	330	486
