= Vandre Assembly constituency =

Former constituency of the Maharashtra legislative assembly in India

Coordinates: 19.061°N 72.841°E

Vandre
- Former constituency for the Maharashtra Legislative Assembly

Constituency details
- Country: India
- Region: Western India
- State: Maharashtra
- Established: 1955
- Abolished: 2008
- Reservation: None

Vandre (formerly Bandra) was one of the constituencies of the Maharashtra Legislative Assembly in India. It was made defunct after the constituency map of India was redrawn in 2008.

== Members of Legislative Assembly ==
Year	Member	Party
1957	Purushottam Ganesh Kher	Indian National Congress
1962	Purushottam Ganesh Kher	Indian National Congress
1967	Purushottam Ganesh Kher	Indian National Congress
1972	Jorge D. Souza	Indian National Congress
1978	Varde Sadanand Shankar	Janata Party
1980	Ahmed B. Zakaria	Indian National Congress (I)
1985	Qureshi Shamim Rashid	Indian National Congress
1990	Salim Zakaria	Indian National Congress
1995	Jayashree Ramdas Nayak	Bharatiya Janata Party
1999	Baba Siddique	Indian National Congress
2004	Baba Siddique	Indian National Congress
2008 onwards: See Vandre East & Vandre West

== Election results ==
=== Assembly Election 2004 ===
2004 Maharashtra Legislative Assembly election : Bandra
Party	Candidate	Votes	%	±%
INC	Baba Siddique	44,517	56.19%	New
BJP	Shaina Nana Chudasama	25,877	32.66%	▲13.76
Independent	Edwin Brito	5,482	6.92%	New
BSP	Singh Chandrashekhar (Mannubhai)	1,945	2.45%	New
Independent	Salvador Henry Swami (Edward)	485	0.61%	New
Independent	Way Prithyani (Archie)	476	0.60%	New
Margin of victory		18,640	23.53%	▲7.58
Turnout		79,227	43.17%	▲5.50
Total valid votes		79,227		
Registered electors		1,83,536		▲47.92
INC gain from INC(I)		Swing	▲8.17	

=== Assembly Election 1999 ===
1999 Maharashtra Legislative Assembly election : Vandre
Party	Candidate	Votes	%	±%
INC	Baba Ziauddan Siddique	38,380	47.89%	▲20.46
BJP	Deepak S. Padwal	29,476	36.78%	▲0.14
Independent	Fernandis Steven	7,501	9.36%	New
NCP	Salim Zakaria	4,198	5.24%	New
Margin of victory		8,904	11.11%	▲1.90
Turnout		82,032	46.89%	▼8.82
Total valid votes		80,137		
Registered electors		1,74,948		▲6.47
INC gain from BJP		Swing	▲11.25	

=== Assembly Election 1995 ===
1995 Maharashtra Legislative Assembly election : Vandre
Party	Candidate	Votes	%	±%
BJP	Jayashree Ramdas Nayak	32,887	36.64%	▼3.28
INC	Salim Zakaria	24,621	27.43%	▼18.01
Independent	Oliver Andrade Paixao	9,936	11.07%	New
SP	Babu Qureshi	8,562	9.54%	New
JD	Advocate Tasneem Khan	6,447	7.18%	▼6.37
Independent	Maj. Gen. (Retd. ) Eustace D'Souza	2,600	2.90%	New
BSP	Shyam Dhondbaji Gajbhiye	2,012	2.24%	New
Margin of victory		8,266	9.21%	▲3.68
Turnout		90,785	55.25%	▲6.81
Total valid votes		89,755		
Registered electors		1,64,322		▲4.23
BJP gain from INC		Swing	▼8.80	

=== Assembly Election 1990 ===
1990 Maharashtra Legislative Assembly election : Vandre
Party	Candidate	Votes	%	±%
INC	Salim Zakaria	34,251	45.44%	▼13.11
BJP	Ramdas Nayak	30,086	39.92%	New
JD	Ahmed B. Zakaria	10,215	13.55%	New
Margin of victory		4,165	5.53%	▼18.07
Turnout		76,084	48.26%	▲8.08
Total valid votes		75,373		
Registered electors		1,57,654		▲21.07
INC hold		Swing	▼13.11	

=== Assembly Election 1985 ===
1985 Maharashtra Legislative Assembly election : Vandre
Party	Candidate	Votes	%	±%
INC	Qureshi Shamim Rashid	30,293	58.56%	▲43.38
JP	Sudha Varde	18,085	34.96%	▼33.00
Independent	Kuldeep Makhni	1,050	2.03%	New
Independent	Choudhry Usman Gani Hussein	1,023	1.98%	New
Independent	A. V. Fernandis	587	1.13%	New
Independent	Jaiwant Malhari Kirtikar	316	0.61%	New
Margin of victory		12,208	23.60%	▼29.18
Turnout		52,353	40.21%	▼15.97
Total valid votes		51,733		
Registered electors		1,30,213		▲11.39
INC gain from JP		Swing	▼9.40	

=== Assembly Election 1980 ===
1980 Maharashtra Legislative Assembly election : Bandra
Party	Candidate	Votes	%	±%
INC(I)	Ahmed B. Zakaria	22,440	48.02%	New
JP	Sadanand Shankar Varde	14,986	32.07%	New
BJP	Pai Prabhakar Sanjiv	8,833	18.90%	New
Independent	Lav Ramchandra Malik	292	0.62%	New
Margin of victory		7,454	15.95%	▼9.33
Turnout		47,230	38.07%	▼24.64
Total valid votes		46,732		
Registered electors		1,24,077		▼7.47
INC(I) gain from INC		Swing	▼5.17	

=== Assembly Election 1978 ===
1978 Maharashtra Legislative Assembly election : Vandre
Party	Candidate	Votes	%	±%
JP	Varde Sadanand Shankar	44,245	67.95%	New
INC	Pai Prabhakar Sanjeev	9,882	15.18%	New
INC(I)	Awale Premchand Vithal	8,593	13.20%	New
Independent	Zakaria Saleem A. Razzak	2,083	3.20%	New
Margin of victory		34,363	52.78%	
Turnout		66,060	56.51%	
Total valid votes		65,110		
Registered electors		1,16,901		
JP win (new seat)				

=== Assembly Election 1972 ===
1972 Maharashtra Legislative Assembly election : Bandra
Party	Candidate	Votes	%	±%
INC	Jorge D. Souza	44,434	53.19%	▲13.19
SSP	Sadanand Shankar Varde	23,316	27.91%	New
SS	Madhukar R. Sarpoidar	9,196	11.01%	New
ABJS	Danjibhai Raghavji Tank	3,499	4.19%	▼2.82
RPI	Sadanand Devaram Powar	2,015	2.41%	New
Independent	Mohamed George	1,080	1.29%	New
Margin of victory		21,118	25.28%	▲13.25
Turnout		85,194	63.54%	▼2.92
Total valid votes		83,540		
Registered electors		1,34,089		▲25.76
INC hold		Swing	▲13.19	

=== Assembly Election 1967 ===
1967 Maharashtra Legislative Assembly election : Bandra
Party	Candidate	Votes	%	±%
INC	Purushottam Ganesh Kher	27,817	40.00%	▼24.33
PSP	Sadanand Shankar Varde	19,454	27.98%	New
SSP	B. A. Mumbarkar	8,895	12.79%	New
SWA	S. A. H. Kasam	8,494	12.22%	▼8.48
ABJS	M. Y. Deolekar	4,876	7.01%	New
Margin of victory		8,363	12.03%	▼31.62
Turnout		72,056	67.58%	▲2.62
Total valid votes		69,536		
Registered electors		1,06,620		▼5.08
INC hold		Swing	▼24.33	

=== Assembly Election 1962 ===
1962 Maharashtra Legislative Assembly election : Bandra
Party	Candidate	Votes	%	±%
INC	Purushottam Ganesh Kher	45,235	64.33%	▲6.79
SWA	Arthur William Felix Menezes	14,548	20.69%	New
CPI	Keshao Nikanth Jolekar	10,529	14.97%	New
Margin of victory		30,687	43.64%	▲18.57
Turnout		72,196	64.27%	▼4.53
Total valid votes		70,312		
Registered electors		1,12,330		▲68.13
INC hold		Swing	▲6.79	

=== Assembly Election 1957 ===
1957 Bombay State Legislative Assembly election : Bandra
Party	Candidate	Votes	%	±%
INC	Purushottam Ganesh Kher	25,806	57.55%	New
PSP	Bagwe Gajanan Shridhar	14,560	32.47%	New
Independent	Peerbhoy Yusuf Shabanally	2,947	6.57%	New
Independent	Limaye Madhu	1,531	3.41%	New
Margin of victory		11,246	25.08%	
Turnout		44,844	67.12%	
Total valid votes		44,844		
Registered electors		66,811		
INC win (new seat)				

== See also ==
- List of constituencies of Maharashtra Legislative Assembly
