= Trupti Sawant =

Indian politician

Member of Legislative Assembly of Maharashtra
- In office 2015–2019
- Preceded by: Prakash Sawant
- Succeeded by: Zeeshan Siddique
- Constituency: Vandre East

Personal details
- Born: 15 september, 1980
- Party: Maharashtra Navnirman Sena (2024-Present)
- Other political affiliations: Bharatiya Janata Party (2021-2024); Shiv Sena (2015-2019); Independent (2019-2021)
- Spouse: Bala Sawant
- Education: chetana college (2009)

Trupti Prakash Sawant is a Maharashtra Navnirman Sena politician from Mumbai, Maharashtra. She was a Member of Legislative Assembly from Vandre East Vidhan Sabha constituency of Mumbai, Maharashtra, India till a member of Shiv Sena. She defeated Ex Chief Minister, Narayan Rane in 2015 Bandra East By-election by margin of 19,008 votes.

== Positions held ==
- 2015: Elected to Maharashtra Legislative Assembly

== See also ==
- Mumbai North Central Lok Sabha constituency
