= K. S. Sabarinadhan =

Indian politician (born 1983)

- കെ.എസ്. ശബരീനാഥൻ
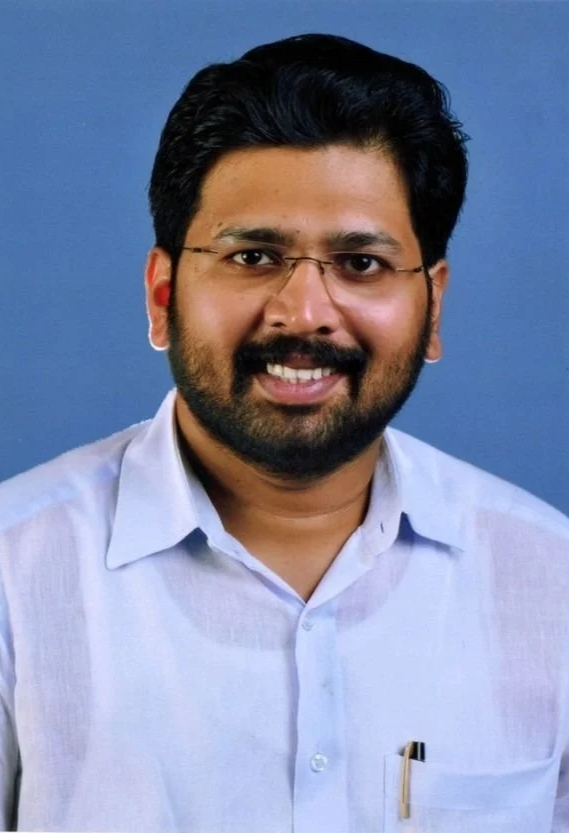

Member of the Kerala Legislative Assembly
- In office 1 July 2015 – 23 May 2021
- Preceded by: G. Karthikeyan
- Succeeded by: G. Steephen
- Constituency: Aruvikkara

Personal details
- Born: 5 September 1983 (age 43) Thiruvananthapuram, Kerala, India
- Party: Indian National Congress
- Spouse: Divya S. Iyer (m. 2017)
- Children: 1
- Parents: G. Karthikeyan; M. T. Sulekha
- Education: College of Engineering, Trivandrum; Management Development Institute, Gurgaon; Kerala Law Academy
- Occupation: Politician, Lawyer, Engineer

K. S. Sabarinadhan (born 5 September 1983) is an Indian lawyer, engineer and politician who belongs to the Indian National Congress. He represented Aruvikkara constituency in the Kerala Legislative Assembly from 2015 to 2021. He is now currently serving as the ward councillor for the Kowdiar ward of the Thiruvananthapuram city Municipal Corporation after his victory in the 2025 Kerala Local Body elections

== Early life and education ==
Sabarinadhan was born to former minister and speaker G. Karthikeyan and M. T. Sulekha in Thiruvananthapuram on 5 September 1983.

Sabarinadhan did his schooling at Loyola School, Thiruvananthapuram. He graduated in Electrical Engineering from College of Engineering, Trivandrum in 2005. Thereafter he worked for a brief period in IT sector at Mindtree, Bangalore. He completed his MBA from Management Development Institute, Gurgaon in 2008. After that, he worked with the Tata Group in Mumbai for several years, eventually spending a few years working with the Tata Trusts in the areas of healthcare and nutrition.

== Personal life ==
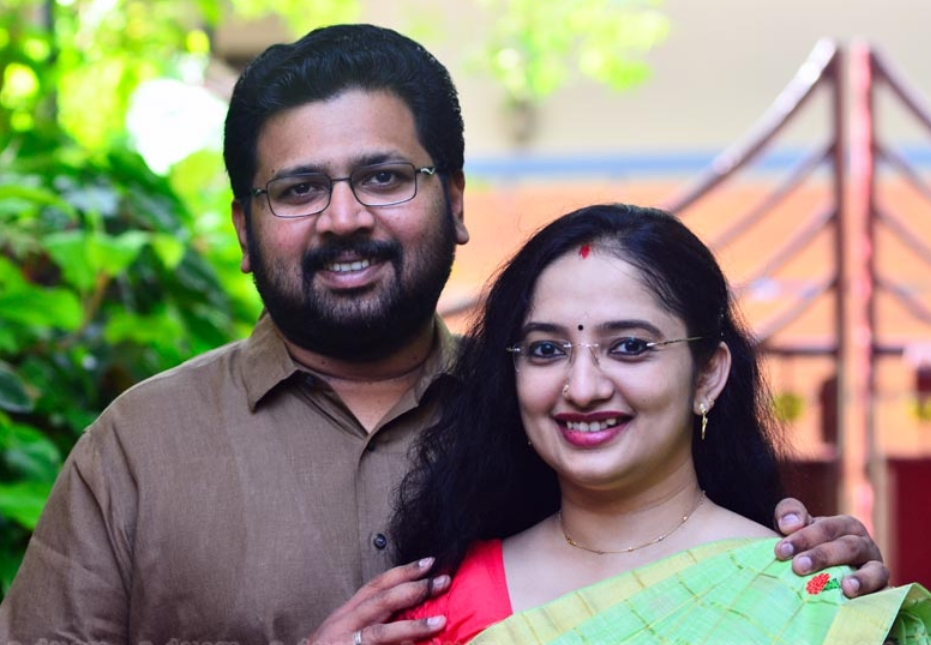
K.S Sabarinadhan with wife Divya S. Iyer

Sabarinadhan is married to Divya S. Iyer, a civil service officer, thus becoming the first MLA–IAS couple in Kerala. The couple have a son.

== Political career ==
In 2015, Sabarinadhan contested the by-election from Aruvikkara constituency, which was vacated due to the death of his father. He defeated M. Vijayakumar by a margin of 10,128 votes.

In the 2016 Kerala Legislative Assembly election, he was re-elected from Aruvikkara constituency. He defeated A. A. Rasheed of CPI(M) by a margin of 21,314 votes. In 2020, he became the vice president of Kerala Youth Congress. In the 2021 Kerala Legislative Assembly election, he lost to G. Steephen of the CPI(M) by 5046 votes.

In the 2026 Kerala Legislative Assembly election, he lost from Nemon constituency to Rajeev Chandrashekharan of Bharatiya Janata Party.

In the 2025 Kerala Local Body Elections to the Thiruvananthapuram City Corporation, he contested as the Mayor candidate of the Indian National Congress and won from the Kowdiar ward. He is now currently serving as the ward councilor for Kowdiar.
