= Vandre East Assembly constituency =

Constituency of the Maharashtra legislative assembly in India

Coordinates: 19.057°N 72.850°E

Bandra East
- Constituency No. 176 for the Maharashtra Legislative Assembly

Constituency details
- Country: India
- Region: Western India
- State: Maharashtra
- District: Mumbai Suburban
- Lok Sabha constituency: Mumbai North Central
- Established: 2008
- Total electors: 249,114
- Reservation: None

Member of Legislative Assembly
- 15th Maharashtra Legislative Assembly
- Incumbent Varun Sardesai
- Party: SS(UBT)
- Alliance: MVA
- Elected year: 2024

Vandre East Assembly constituency is one of the 288 Vidhan Sabha constituencies of Maharashtra state in western India.

== Overview ==
Vandre East constituency is one of the 26 Vidhan Sabha constituencies located in Mumbai Suburban district.

Vandre East is part of Mumbai North Central Lok Sabha constituency along with five other Vidhan Sabha constituencies in Mumbai Suburban district, namely Vile Parle, Chandivali, Kurla, Kalina and Vandre West.

== Members of the Legislative Assembly ==
Year	Member	Party
Until 2008: See Vandre & Kherwadi
2009	Prakash Sawant	Shiv Sena
2014	Prakash Sawant	Shiv Sena
2015^	Trupti Sawant	Shiv Sena
2019	Zeeshan Siddique	Indian National Congress
2024	Varun Sardesai	Shiv Sena (UBT)

== Election results ==
=== Assembly Election 2024 ===
2024 Maharashtra Legislative Assembly election : Vandre East
Party	Candidate	Votes	%	±%
SS(UBT)	Varun Sardesai	57,708	42.86%	New
NCP	Zeeshan Siddique	46,343	34.42%	New
MNS	Trupti Prakash (Bala) Sawant	16,074	11.94%	▲3.33
Independent	Kunal Sarmalkar	8,520	6.33%	New
NOTA	None of the Above	1,912	1.42%	▼0.63
VBA	Pratik Vijay Jadhav	1,631	1.21%	▼1.14
BSP	Ajay Vithal Kapadane	1,000	0.74%	▼0.14
Independent	Mehmood Deshmukh	895	0.66%	New
Margin of victory		11,365	8.44%	▲3.77
Turnout		136,542	54.81%	▲4.44
Total valid votes		134,630		
Registered electors		249,114		▼0.90
SS(UBT) gain from INC		Swing	▲11.96	

=== Assembly Election 2019 ===
2019 Maharashtra Legislative Assembly election : Vandre East
Party	Candidate	Votes	%	±%
INC	Zeeshan Siddique	38,337	30.90%	New
SS	Prin. Vishwanath Pandurang Mahadeshwar	32,547	26.24%	▼25.32
Independent	Trupti Prakash (Bala) Sawant	24,071	19.40%	New
AIMIM	Mohammed Saalim Qureshi	12,594	10.15%	▼4.57
MNS	Akhil Anil Chitre	10,683	8.61%	New
VBA	Javed Ahmed Fath Mhmmed Saikh	2,913	2.35%	New
NOTA	None of the Above	2,548	2.05%	▲0.59
BSP	Gamre Vishal Viswash	1,091	0.88%	New
Margin of victory		5,790	4.67%	▼13.92
Turnout		126,620	50.37%	▲11.80
Total valid votes		124,049		
Registered electors		251,371		▼5.17
INC gain from SS		Swing	▼20.65	

=== Assembly By-election 2015 ===
2015 Maharashtra Legislative Assembly by-election : Vandre East
Party	Candidate	Votes	%	±%
SS	Trupti Prakash (Bala) Sawant	52,711	51.56%	▲18.09
Independent	Narayan Rane	33,703	32.96%	New
AIMIM	Khan Rahebar Siraj(Raja)	15,050	14.72%	▼4.67
NOTA	None of the Above	1,495	1.46%	▲0.75
Margin of victory		19,008	18.59%	▲5.98
Turnout		103,061	38.88%	▼8.31
Total valid votes		102,242		
Registered electors		265,079		▲0.49
SS hold		Swing	▲18.09	

=== Assembly Election 2014 ===
2014 Maharashtra Legislative Assembly election : Vandre East
Party	Candidate	Votes	%	±%
SS	Prakash Bala Sawant	41,388	33.47%	▼4.75
BJP	Krishna Dhondu Parkar	25,791	20.85%	New
AIMIM	Khan Rahebar Siraj(Raja)	23,976	19.39%	New
INC	Bagadi Sanjeev Kherlal	12,229	9.89%	▼22.12
NCP	Santosh Tukaram Dhuwali	9,725	7.86%	New
MNS	Shilpa Atul Sarpotdar	5,401	4.37%	▼11.63
BSP	Dhotre Pravin Ashok	1,891	1.53%	▲0.17
NOTA	None of the Above	883	0.71%	New
Margin of victory		15,597	12.61%	▲6.40
Turnout		124,578	47.22%	▲1.14
Total valid votes		123,672		
Registered electors		263,798		▲1.00
SS hold		Swing	▼4.75	

=== Assembly Election 2009 ===
2009 Maharashtra Legislative Assembly election : Vandre East
Party	Candidate	Votes	%	±%
SS	Prakash Bala Sawant	45,659	38.22%	New
INC	Chandurkar Janardan Chandrappa	38,239	32.01%	New
MNS	Shilpa Atul Sarpotdar	19,109	16.00%	New
SP	Shaikh Shabbir Hussain	10,926	9.15%	New
BSP	Jadhav Vijay Bhaguram	1,619	1.36%	New
Margin of victory		7,420	6.21%	
Turnout		119,465	45.74%	
Total valid votes		119,463		
Registered electors		261,177		
SS win (new seat)				

== See also ==
- Bandra
- List of constituencies of Maharashtra Vidhan Sabha
