= Bijoy Koijam =

Indian politician

Bijoy Koijam is a politician from Manipur, India. In 2002, he was elected to the Legislative Assembly of Manipur, as the Manipur State Congress Party candidate in the constituency Thongju. In 2003, he was appointed Minister of Family Welfare in the state government. He was removed from his ministerial post in 2004. In 2007, he retained his Assembly seat, contesting on behalf of the Indian National Congress.

Koijam is the chairman of the Manipur Electronic Development Corporation.

In August 2007, a suspected People's Revolutionary Party of Kangleipak militant was arrested from Koijam's residence. Koijam claimed that the man had worked as his driver and alleged that the arrest was politically motivated.

In March 2008, PREPAK militants attacked Koijam's residence, hurling a bomb at it.
