= List of Rajyotsava Award recipients (1981–1990) =

Karnataka Rajyotsava Prashasti
- Civilian award
- Sponsored by: Government of Karnataka
- Formerly called: Mysore State Award (1966–1972)
- Rewards: • ₹1,00,000/- • Gold Medal
- First award: 1966
- Final award: 2020

Highlights
- Total awarded: 2400 (Awardees including Individuals & Institutions)

The Rajyotsava Prashasti or Rajyotsava Award, the second highest civilian honor of the Karnataka state of India are conferred annually by the Karnataka Government on the occasion of the establishment of the state on 1 November celebrated as the Kannada Rajyotsava.

The awards are presented in Bengaluru by the Chief Minister of Karnataka on 1 November of every year. Each award carries an amount of ₹100,000, a 20-gram gold medal and a citation. In addition to that, the government has in the past, allotted commercial land for eligible awardees.

== Recipients ==
List of winners:

Year	Recipients	Field
1981	Shanta Rao	Dance
1981	Madhugiri Ramu	Fine Arts
1981	A. Subba Rao	Music
1981	B. N. Suresh	Music
1981	Shamacharya	Sculpture
1981	H. K. Ranganath	Drama
1981	Gorur Ramaswamy Iyengar	Literature
1981	S. L. Bhyrappa	Literature
1981	K. S. Nissar Ahmed	Literature
1981	H. Y. Sharada Prasad	Literature
1981	Anupama Niranjana	Literature
1981	Prakash Padukone	Sports
1981	Uday K. Prabhu	Sports
1981	Loknath Bolar	Sports
1981	K. Govindaraj	Sports
1981	M. P. Ganesh	Sports
1981	Angel Mary Joseph	Sports
1981	Karnataka State Council for Science & Technology	Science (Institution)
1981	C. H. Lakshmanaiah	Agriculture
1981	R. Dwarakanath	Agriculture
1981	K. S. Ashwath	Cinema
1981	Malladihalli Raghavendra	Social Work
1981	Lakshmi Nizamuddin	Social Work
1981	Ammakka Ganapathi	Social Work
1981	S. R. Chandrashekar	Medicine
1982	C. N. R. Rao	Science
1982	Agram Rangayya	Journalism
1982	Basavanna Shilpi	Sculpture
1982	Biddu Appiah	Music
1982	D. V. Rao	Social Work
1982	M. A. Hafiz	Medicine
1982	P. O. Jadhav	Medicine
1982	Kantheerava Deshpande	Language
1982	Kamaladevi Chattopadhyay	Fine Arts
1982	Kondajji Basappa	Scouts
1982	S. R. Puttanna Kanagal	Cinema
1982	H. M. Nayak	Literature
1982	Puttamma Kusthi Basappa	Social Work
1982	Parvathamma Basappa	Social Work
1982	G. M. Pai	Medicine
1982	K. J. Rao	Cinema
1982	Shantadevi Malawada	Social Work
1982	Seetha Kagal	Music
1982	Siddayya Puranik	Literature
1982	T. S. Satyan	Photography
1982	Setumadhavarao Pagadi	History
1982	T. C. Sundaramurthy	Folklore
1982	Usha Navarathnaram	Literature
1982	Malam Ahmed	Engineering
1982	M. W. Tilak	Aeronautics
1982	Kumar Gandharva	Music
1983	Raja Rao	Literature
1983	Hamid Alyas	Literature
1983	Kayyar Kinhanna Rai	Literature
1983	U. R. Ananthamurthy	Literature
1983	Rumale Chennabasappa	Fine Arts
1983	S. M. Pandit	Fine Arts
1983	U. R. Rao	Science
1983	Madhav Gadgil	Science
1983	Bhimsen Joshi	Music
1983	A. D. Zakaria	Music
1983	M. S. Sathyu	Cinema
1983	Aarathi	Cinema
1983	Krishnavattam	Journalism
1983	R. K. Laxman	Cartoon
1983	Reeth Abraham	Sports
1983	Roger Binny	Sports
1983	Syed Kirmani	Sports
1983	K. Krishnamurthy	Agriculture
1983	K. M. Gadaad	Agriculture
1983	Zafar Futehally	Agriculture
1983	Tagadur Ramachandra Rao	Social Work
1983	M. Krishna	Social Work
1983	S. Krishna	Social Work
1983	Champabai Peerji	Social Work
1983	Seethamma	Social Work
1983	Srinivas Narasimha Rao Koulagudda	Medicine
1983	Parvathavani	Drama
1983	Armando Menezes	Education
1983	K. Venkatagiri Gowda	Economics
1984	Chaduranga	Literature
1984	G. S. Shivarudrappa	Literature
1984	M. Akbar Ali	Literature
1984	A. N. Murthy Rao	Literature
1984	Master Hirannaiah	Drama
1984	S. K. Kareem Khan	Folklore
1984	Chandrabhaga Devi	Dance
1984	M. P. L. Sastry	Education
1984	M. T. Jayanna	Agriculture
1984	M. Mahadevappa	Agriculture
1984	B. H. Katharaki	Agriculture
1984	Mir Iqbal Hussain	Social Work
1984	Ho. Srinivasaiah	Social Work
1984	H. Sudarshan	Social Work
1984	Udaykumar	Cinema
1984	Leelavathi	Cinema
1984	F. M. Soofi	Fine Arts
1984	M. S. Nanjunda Rao	Fine Arts
1984	Nagesh Bhimrao Sabannanavar	Fine Arts
1984	D. Seshappa	Music
1984	Siddarama Jambaladinni	Music
1984	M. L. Veerabhadraiah	Music
1984	M. Y. Ghorpade	Photography
1984	Y. V. Rudrappa	Medicine
1984	P. S. Shankar	Medicine
1984	M. Krishna Bhargava	Medicine
1984	Hanumantha Rao Manjrekar	Journalism
1984	Arjunadeva	Journalism
1984	R. Murthy	Cartoon
1984	C. L. J. Saldanha	Environment
1984	Satish Dhawan	Science
1985	S. S. Malawada	Literature
1985	R. C. Hiremath	Literature
1985	M. V. Seetharamiah	Literature
1985	D. Javaregowda	Literature
1985	T. S. Shamarao	Literature
1985	Ramarao V. Naik	Music
1985	P. Bhuvaneshwaraiah	Music
1985	Bhadragiri Achyuthadas	Music
1985	Komala Varadan	Dance
1985	Ningayya Sangayya Pujar	Folklore
1985	K. K. Hebbar	Fine Arts
1985	Renjala Gopala Shenoy	Sculpture
1985	S. V. Naik	Fine Arts
1985	B. V. K. Shastry	Art Review
1985	Vijaya Bhaskar	Cinema
1985	S. R. Rao	Archaeology
1985	S. V. Hitthalmani	Agriculture
1985	D. Veerendra Heggade	Social Work
1985	Y. Ramachandra	Social Work
1985	Shimoga Subbanna	Music
1985	Vinay Ubhaykar	Tourism
1985	M. V. Kamath	Journalism
1985	C. M. Ramachandra	Journalism
1985	K. N. Harikumar	Journalism
1985	H. Kusumakar	Journalism
1985	K. S. Haridasa Bhatta	Education
1985	H. N. Ramakrishna	Education
1985	Chindodi Leela	Theatre
1985	Keremane Shivarama Hegde	Yakshagana
1985	Ganapathi Sundaram Thomas	Photography
1985	M. Chidananda Murthy	Research
1985	R. Sathyanarayana	Research
1985	Mir Mohammed Hussain	Urdu Education
1985	G. Narayana Reddy	Medicine
1985	V. Parameshwar	Medicine
1986	K. Shivaram Karanth	Literature
1986	R. K. Narayan	Literature
1986	V. K. Gokak	Literature
1986	Gopalakrishna Adiga	Literature
1986	Siddalingaiah	Literature
1986	S. B. Joshi	Research
1986	S. K. Ramachandra Rao	Research
1986	B. S. Kesavan	Library Science
1986	Mallikarjun Mansur	Music
1986	Basavaraj Rajguru	Music
1986	R. K. Srikantan	Music
1986	Honnappa Bhagavathar	Music
1986	Manjunath	Music
1986	H. P. Ramachar	Music
1986	Mysore Ananthaswamy	Music
1986	C. Ashwath	Music
1986	Balappa Hukkeri	Folklore
1986	Bhadragiri Keshava Das	Harikatha
1986	Joladarashi Doddana Gowda	Gamaka
1986	Maya Rao	Dance
1986	G. B. Joshi	Drama
1986	B. Jayamma	Drama
1986	R. Nagarathnamma	Drama
1986	Uppinakudru Kogga Kamat	Puppetry
1986	D. Vadiraj	Sculpture
1986	R. M. Hadapad	Fine Arts
1986	N. Narasimhachar	Fine Arts
1986	N. Pushpamala	Fine Arts
1986	S. N. Chandrashekhar	Art Review
1986	G. V. Iyer	Cinema
1986	T. Pattabhirama Reddy	Cinema
1986	E. Hanumantha Rao	Photography
1986	N. S. Seetharama Shastry	Journalism
1986	P. K. Srinivasan	Journalism
1986	Y. N. Krishnamurthy	Journalism
1986	Vaddarse Raghuram Shetty	Journalism
1986	K. Sathyanarayana	Journalism
1986	R. N. Chakravarthy	Journalism
1986	C. D. Narasimhaiah	Education
1986	N. Rudraiah	Education
1986	H. R. Vishwanath	Education
1986	Vandana Rao	Sports
1986	K. R. Lavaraju	Sports
1986	B. Srikantaiah	Physical Education
1986	Raja Ramanna	Science
1986	S. Chandrasekhar	Science
1986	Roddam Narasimha	Science
1986	B. Desikachar	Medicine
1986	D. Chinniah	Medicine
1986	P. N. Srinivasa Rao	Medicine
1986	K. V. Shankara Gowda	Social Work
1986	Mahadeva Banakar	Social Work
1987	B. M. Idinabba	Literature
1987	Devanur Mahadeva	Literature
1987	Husna Sarvar	Literature
1987	Ezasuddin Saab	Literature
1987	J. S. Paramashivaiah	Folklore
1987	Balekhan	Music
1987	T. N. Balakrishna	Cinema
1987	Khadri Shamanna	Journalism
1987	B. S. Chandrasekhar	Sports
1987	S. G. Balekundri	Engineering
1987	R. Narayan	Agriculture
1987	B. Hanumaiah	Medicine
1987	D. G. Benakappa	Medicine
1987	H. S. Narayan	Medicine
1987	Umabai Kundapur	Social Work
1987	Varadaraja Adsa	Social Work
1987	C. L. Narasimhaiah Shetty	Social Work
1987	B. T. Lakshman	Social Work
1987	S. R. Hiremath	Social Work
1987	S. N. Subba Rao	Bharatiya Seva Dal
1987	P. Venkoba Rao	Sarvodaya
1987	N. Lakshmana Rao	Administration
1987	T. R. Satish Chandran	Administration
1988	P. T. Narasimhachar	Literature
1988	R. S. Mugali	Literature
1988	S. S. Bhoosnurmath	Literature
1988	K. P. Poornachandra Tejaswi	Literature
1988	H. K. Narayana	Music
1988	V. Venkatasubba Rao	Music
1988	B. Ramadasappa	Music
1988	N. R. Rama Rao	Music
1988	K. Venkatalakshamma	Dance
1988	Chandrashekhara Kambara	Drama
1988	H. L. Nagegowda	Folklore
1988	L. P. Anchan	Fine Arts
1988	M. A. Chetty	Fine Arts
1988	B. Saroja Devi	Cinema
1988	T. V. Venkatachala Sastry	Research
1988	A. J. Narayana Gowda	Gamaka
1988	H. U. K. Udupa	Science
1988	M. Gurudas	Medicine
1988	R. B. Patil	Medicine
1988	Parthanarayana Pandit	Medicine
1988	G. V. K. Rao	Administration
1988	S. V. Patil	Agriculture
1988	P. Selvie Das	Education
1988	D. Mariyappa	Education
1988	Mumtaz Ahmed Khan	Education
1988	Sharanabasappa Appa	Social Work
1988	Sajjad Nasheem Syed Hussain Shah	Social Work
1988	Hari Anant Pai	Social Work
1988	B. A. Basme	Social Work
1988	V. V. Thegginmani	Social Work
1988	S. R. Chandran	Social Work
1988	B. K. S. Iyengar	Yoga
1988	E. A. S. Prasanna	Sports
1988	R. K. Joshi	Journalism
1988	Aravind Hegde	Forest Conservation
1989	Niranjana	Literature
1989	Chennaveera Kanavi	Literature
1989	K. Krishnamurthy	Sanskrit
1989	Mohammed Ayaz	Urdu
1989	R. N. Doraiswamy	Music
1989	Arjunasa Nakoda	Music
1989	Manik Rao Raichurkar	Music
1989	Shyamala G. Bhave	Music
1989	C. Radhakrishna	Dance
1989	K. V. Subbanna	Drama
1989	M. T. V. Acharya	Fine Arts
1989	R. G. Raikar	Fine Arts
1989	T. Hombaiah	Folklore
1989	Malpe Shankaranarayana Samaga	Yakshagana
1989	M. V. Rajamma	Cinema
1989	Shadakshari Settar	Research
1989	B. V. Sreekantan	Science
1989	P. V. Acharya	Journalism
1989	M. B. Singh	Journalism
1989	B. Sheikh Ali	Education
1989	M. H. Marigowda	Agriculture
1989	G. R. Vishwanath	Sports
1989	Malathi Holla	Sports
1989	Sudha V. Reddy	Social Work
1989	M. R. Ramaiah	Social Work
1989	P. J. Fernandes	Administration
1989	M. K. Panduranga Setty	Educational Institution
1989	M. M. Joshi	Medicine
1989	Chamaraj	Medicine
1989	Allamaprabhu	Photography
1990	N. K. Kulkarni	Literature
1990	R. Y. Dharwadkar	Literature
1990	T. Sunandamma	Literature
1990	Malali Vasanthakumar	Literature
1990	L. S. Sheshagiri Rao	Literature
1990	Ramanna Bhajantri	Music
1990	A. V. Narayanappa	Music
1990	Vinayak Torvi	Music
1990	M. S. Natarajan	Arts
1990	Puttur Venkatappa Dogra	Music
1990	T. K. Desai	Music
1990	Vasant Kanakapur	Music
1990	Sheni Gopalakrishna Bhat	Yakshagana
1990	Govinda Naika	Yakshagana
1990	B. R. Kalinga Navada	Yakshagana
1990	Simpi Linganna	Literature
1990	'Kamsale' Mahadevaiah	Folklore
1990	Hammigi Mudimallappa	Folklore
1990	Patel Kempegowda	Folklore
1990	Hombaiah	Folklore
1990	V. Balu	Fine Arts
1990	H. G Basavannachar	Sculpture
1990	Krishna Srinivas Potedar	Fine Arts
1990	N. Lakshminarayan	Cinema
1990	Aruna Raje Patil	Cinema
1990	Vishnuvardhan	Cinema
1990	Ambareesh	Cinema
1990	Shankar Nag	Cinema
1990	S. Gurumurthy	Education
1990	C. N. Mangala	Education
1990	K. Hanumanthappa	Education
1990	T. K. Meti	Education
1990	G. S. Gayi	Education
1990	K. Shama Rao	Journalism
1990	S. V. Jayasheela Rao	Journalism
1990	P. Ramaiah	Journalism
1990	Santosh Kumar Gulwadi	Journalism
1990	I. K. Jagirdar	Journalism
1990	Raj Imtiaz	Journalism
1990	M. S. Topannavar	Journalism
1990	Sulochana Gunasheela	Medicine
1990	C. Chikkananjappa	Medicine
1990	B. M. Jayaram	Medicine
1990	M. Gurappa	Medicine
1990	S. Abdul Rehman	Medicine
1990	C. Parvathamma	Research
1990	M. M. Patil	Co-operation
1990	S. K. Ameen	Co-operation
1990	A. M. Rajashekharaiah	Political Science
1990	Shivakumara Swamiji	Social Work
1990	Gurapp Malakappagar	Social Work
1990	G. M. Patil	Social Work
1990	S. V. Manjunath	Social Work
1990	Kashinath Panchasheela Gavai	Social Work
1990	S. V. Agnihotri	Social Work
1990	H. M. Shivanna	Social Work
1990	Ismail Sultan Geddekar	Social Work
1990	R. M. B. Aradhya	Social Work
1990	H. N. Ramakrishnaiah	Social Work
1990	Neelamma Chennappa Bhadrapur	Social Work
1990	G. Shivashankar	Agriculture
1990	N. P. Patil	Agriculture
1990	B. Satyaji Rao	Sports
1990	Ashwini Nachappa	Sports
1990	Nawab Saab	Sports
1990	Tukaram Kharvi	Sports
1990	Chindodi Karibasavaraj	Theatre
