= Seva Dal =

Volunteer organization of Indian National Congress

Congress Seva Dal
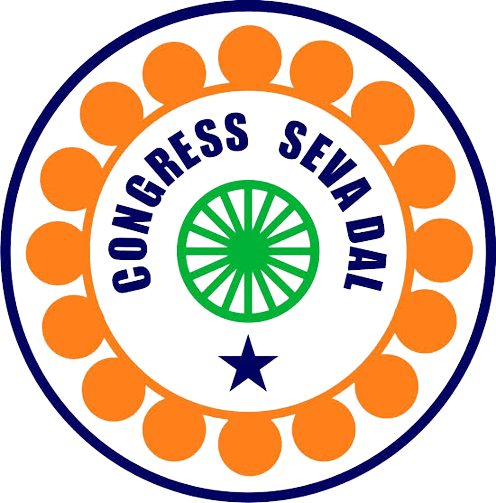
- Founded: 28 December 1923; 102 years ago
- Founder: Narayan Subbarao Hardikar
- Type: Center politics, Peaceful Militia
- Location: Nagpur, Maharashtra, India
- Region served: India
- Method: Ideological process based on Gandhian thoughts
- Key people: Srinivas B. V. (Chief Organiser)
- Website: Official Website
- Formerly called: Hindustani Seva Dal

The Seva Dal is an organization of the Indian National Congress. The organization has a chapter in all the states of India. The members of the organization are known for wearing the Gandhi cap. It is headed by a Chief Organiser Shri Lalji Desai

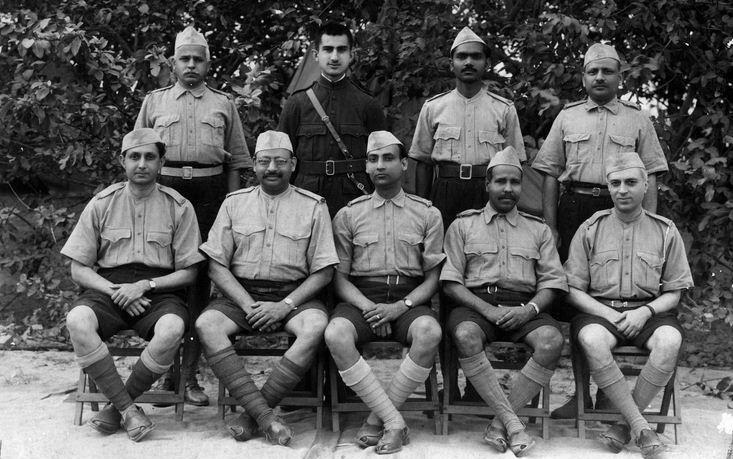
Nehru in uniform with Seva Dal Volunteers in Allahabad

== History ==
In 1923, following the Flag Satyagraha at Nagpur, many activists of the Congress were arrested and sentenced to prison. Unable to tolerate the conditions of the prison, most of them tendered written apologies to the colonial authorities. However, members of the Hubli Seva Mandal, founded by N. S. Hardikar did not submit apologies. This position gained the attention of the Congress's national leadership that had gathered in Nagpur to participate in the satyagraha. It was here that the idea of establishing an organisation of volunteers to combat the Raj was formed. At the Kakinada session of the Congress in 1923, a board under Dr. N. S. Hardikar was constituted for establishing the Seva Dal.

The Seva Dal was established as the Hindustani Seva Mandal on 1 January 1924. According to the resolution at Kakinada, the Seva Dal was to work under the supervision of the Congress party's working committee. Jawaharlal Nehru was its first president. The Dal faced initial opposition from Congressmen, who were opposed to the idea of creating a militia-like organisation in the Congress, seeing it as a threat to the idea of civilian dominance and as being inconsistent with the idea of non-violence. Umabai Kundapur was the founding president of the women's wing of the Seva Dal. Kamaladevi Chattopadhyay was closely associated with the organisation, especially in the 1930s.

In 1931, the Congress Working Committee decided to rename the Hindustani Seva Dal as the Congress Seva Dal, making it the central volunteer organisation of the Congress. Every province was to have a general officer commanding the provincial Seva Dal. The organisation also focused specifically on three categories of people: children, adolescents and adults. All Seva Dal members were required to take an oath, which, among other things, required them to stay aloof from political activity in the Congress. RSS founder Dr. K.B. Hedgewar was also associated with the Congress Seva Dal's predecessor - Hindustani Seva Dal.

Colonial Government of India banned Seva Dal in 1932 for setting up a women's army. The ban was never lifted.

The task of imparting training and organising volunteers was given to the Seva Dal in 1938, which was then headquartered in the Karnatak district of the Bombay presidency. Under Hardikar, an academy for physical training was established and training camps established at several places across India. During the Civil Disobedience Movement, the Seva Dal played an stellar role in enrolling new members in the Congress, organising activities like picketing and in arming the party with an organised but peaceful militia. Following the Civil Disobedience Movement, the colonial authorities lifted the ban on the Congress and its organisations.

== List of Chief Organisers ==
S.no	President	Term			Home State
1.	Mahendra Joshi	2007	2018	11 years	Madhya Pradesh
2.	Lalji Desai	30 March 2018	26 June 2026	8 years	Gujarat
3.	Srinivas B. V.	26 June 2026	Incumbent	0 days	Karnataka
