= C. Kondiah Raju =

Indian artist (1898 – 1976)

- Born: 7 November 1898; Madras, Madras Presidency, British India (now Chennai, Tamil Nadu, India)
- Died: 27 July 1976 (aged 77); Kovilpatti, Tamil Nadu, India
- Education: Government College of Fine Arts, Chennai
- Known for: Calendar art, Hindu art, Indian freedom movement art
- Style: South Indian

C. Kondiah Raju (7 November 1898 – 27 July 1976) was a popular Calendar artist well known for his depictions of Hindu Gods and Goddesses in a typical style, amalgamating the features of contemporary calendar art and traditional South Indian paintings. He reached the peak of his fame during the heyday of the lithographic printing presses in Sivakasi. Kondiah Raju has an important place in the evolution of Indian Calendar art, which gained popular attention with Ravi Varma and continued on through artists such as S. M. Pandit, Mulgaonkar and others in the 20th century. In addition to his painting skills he also displayed a spiritual streak, as also a starkly austere simplicity, that prompted many of his students to call him an 'artist-saint'.

== Brief Biography ==
Kovilpatti Kondiah Raju was born on 7 November 1898 in a house at Malaiya Perumal Koil Street, Mylapore, Madras (now Chennai) to a family of traditional artisans. His father C. Kuppaswami Raju was a Siddha medical practitioner. Before his death in 1912, Kuppaswami made arrangements for the young Kondiah Raju to learn the traditional skill of the Raju community - Religious painting. Kondiah Raju initially learnt painting from several teachers, including Murugesa Naiyakar and N. Subba Naidu, a well known artist from Madurai. In 1916, Kondiah Raju joined the Government School of Arts and Crafts.

In 1920, he joined the Ramana Maharishi Ashram at Thiruvannamalai, further evidence of his spiritual trait that would characterise his near nomadic life and resurface time and again in him. Kondiah, after leaving the Ashram, joined a "village drama" troupe, (or boys' company as they were called in those days of all Men drama troupes).

Eventually, Kondiah Raju and his group began to work for the newly set up litho printing presses of Sivakasi. His Gajendra Motcham, Meenakshi Kalyanam and many other religious prints are considered unrivalled masterpieces and continue to adorn the puja rooms of South Indian households and smaller shrines across the Tamil country. So pervasive are his prints that many South Indians would visualise and recognise not only the many deities, but also leaders of the Indian freedom movement, contemporary political leaders and other important personalities only as depicted in his prints. His prints have been collected internationally and are even archived in the Victoria and Albert Museum, H. Daniel Smith Poster Archive, Syracuse University library.

When Kondiah Raju died on 27 July 1976, his pupils spoke of him with awe, calling him an 'artist-saint'. Contemporary media accounts of his death describe him as a 'Brahmachari whose students were like his children'. Though he had earned a fortune through his artistic commissions, he never married, distributed his wealth to others, and lived a simple life like a saint with one shirt, one veshti and one towel. In 1971, he would even turn down an offer to travel to Chennai to receive a Government award recognising his contributions to art.

== Career ==
Kondiah Raju painted for most of the printers in Sivakasi and Madurai including the Sri Kalaimagal Industries, Madurai; Coronation Litho Works, Sivakasi; Premier Litho Works; Sivakasi. Sivakasi, which is only a few kilometres from Kovilpatti, had its first lithographic printing press in the mid fifties. By 1979, Sivakasi would have 350 photo-offset machines and more than 1000 litho and letter press units in operation. Thanks to the untiring efforts of the Nadar industrialists' community Sivakasi had been transformed from a humdrum village-town to a major industrial centre, prompting the sobriquet - 'India's Little Japan' (Kutti Japan' in Tamil). Kondaiah Raju and his students reaped the rich benefits of their proximity to Sivakasi. His paintings were also printed in many of the Tamil magazines and Deepavali malars (special issues). His latter years were spent in Kovilpatti, Tamil Nadu where he established the "Devi Art Studio". The Studio in addition to paintings would also involve itself in Photography.

Kondiah Raju had a number of pupils who assisted him and would automatically sign in their master's name on all their works during their training. Many like T. S. Subbaiah continued to sign Kondiah Raju's name above his own, even after becoming an established artist and even after the death of his master! His most popular students were M. Ramalingam, T. S. Arunachalam, T. S. Subbaiah, S. Parani Chittar who would establish themselves as master artists in their own right. In addition to the popular religious calendar art Kondiah Raju and his students continued to paint for advertisements, name boards, etc. for many shops and establishments in and around Kovilpatti. T. S. Arunachalam who later took over the studio was well known for "photo retouching" a skill that was important for recycling popular designs in the lithographic printing industry. Many other students of Kondaiah Raju would open studios of their own, dealing in paintings and photography.

== Influences ==
His depictions were mostly influenced not only by Ravi Varma's compositions of the Gods and Goddesses but also by the popular art of Tanjore painting in which his community, the Rajus of Tanjore and Tiruchi had distinguished themselves. The Rajus who had migrated to Tamil Nadu from Andhra under the patronage of the Nayaka kings, had popularised painting techniques related ceiling and wall paintings in temples, decoration of processional vahanas, modelling of stucco sculptures on temple gopurams and vimanams. The Rajus along with the Naidus were also known for their paintings and portraits on wooden panels, glass and mica with delicate gesso work highlighted by gold foils and semi-precious gems. These paintings which would be called Tanjore paintings were not only characterised by the rigorous canons of traditional iconography but also by Islamic artistic techniques and European fashions.

Though many of Kondiah Raju's paintings bear a resemblance with Ravi Varma's paintings, he went further in his treatment of religious subjects by emphasising characteristics of the main subject in line with the depictions in temple and traditional Tanjore paintings. His calendar art unlike Ravi Varma or any other artist, was in a style quite reminiscent of the traditional iconic and formal representation of deities in South Indian paintings as opposed to the western fashion adopted by Ravi Varma or S. M. Pandit. In Kondiah's paintings the central deity is emphasised by providing it a well-lit, central and prominent position and relegating the surroundings to static objects like pillars, lamps, etc. Further it should also be remembered that Kondiah Raju like his forebear Ravi Varma was compelled to stick to not only the canonical iconography traditionally prescribed for the Hindu divinities but also cater to the tastes of the burgeoning Indian middle classes. In another major innovation, he would with his students herald the introduction of German tempera colours in lieu of oil colours for painting in South Indian calendar art. Subsequently, the introduction of Camlin watercolours would ensure that the artist could execute his paintings with greater speed and ease.

== Bibliography ==
- Lawrence A. Babb; Susan S. Wadley, eds. (1 January 1998). Media and the Transformation of Religion in South Asia. Motilal Banarsidass. ISBN 978-81-208-1453-0.
