= Thanjavur painting =

Classical South Indian painting style

- Geographical indication
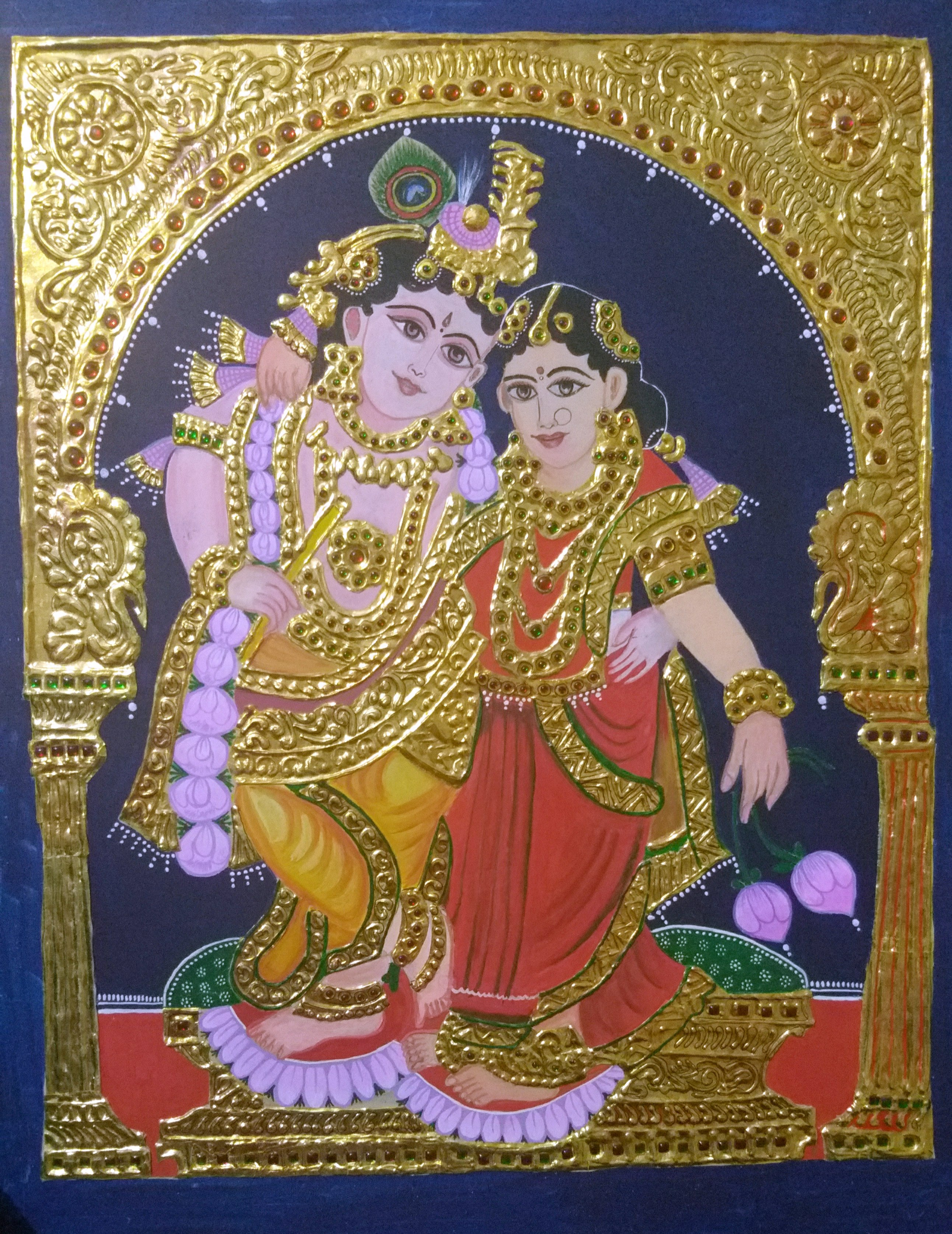
- A Thanjavur painting of Radha Krishna
- Description: painting style originated in Thanjavur
- Type: Manufactured
- Area: Thanjavur, Tamil Nadu
- Country: India
- Registered: 2007-08
- Material: canvas, paint, wood

Thanjavur painting is a classical South Indian painting style, originating from the town of Thanjavur (anglicized as Tanjore) in Tamil Nadu. The art form draws its immediate resources and inspiration from way back about 1600 AD, a period when the Nayakas of Thanjavur under the suzerainty of the Vijayanagara Rayas encouraged art—chiefly, classical dance and music—as well as literature, both in Telugu and Tamil and painting of chiefly Hindu religious subjects in temples. However, it can safely be surmised that Thanjavur painting, as we know it now, originated in the Maratha court of Thanjavur (1676–1855). It has been recognized as a Geographical indication by the Government of India in 2007–08.

Thanjavur paintings are characterised by rich and vivid colours, simple iconic composition, glittering gold foils overlaid on delicate but extensive gesso work, and inlay of glass beads and pieces or very rarely precious and semi-precious gems. In Thanjavur paintings one can see the influence of Deccani, Vijayanagara, Maratha, and even European or Company styles of painting. Essentially serving as devotional icons, the subjects of most paintings are Hindu gods, goddesses, and saints. Episodes from Hindu Puranas, Sthala-puranas and other religious texts were visualised, sketched or traced and painted with the main figure or figures placed in the central section of the picture (mostly within an architecturally delineated space such as a mantapa or prabhavali) surrounded by several subsidiary figures, themes and subjects. There are also many instances when Jain, Sikh, Muslim, other religious and even secular subjects were depicted in Tanjore paintings.

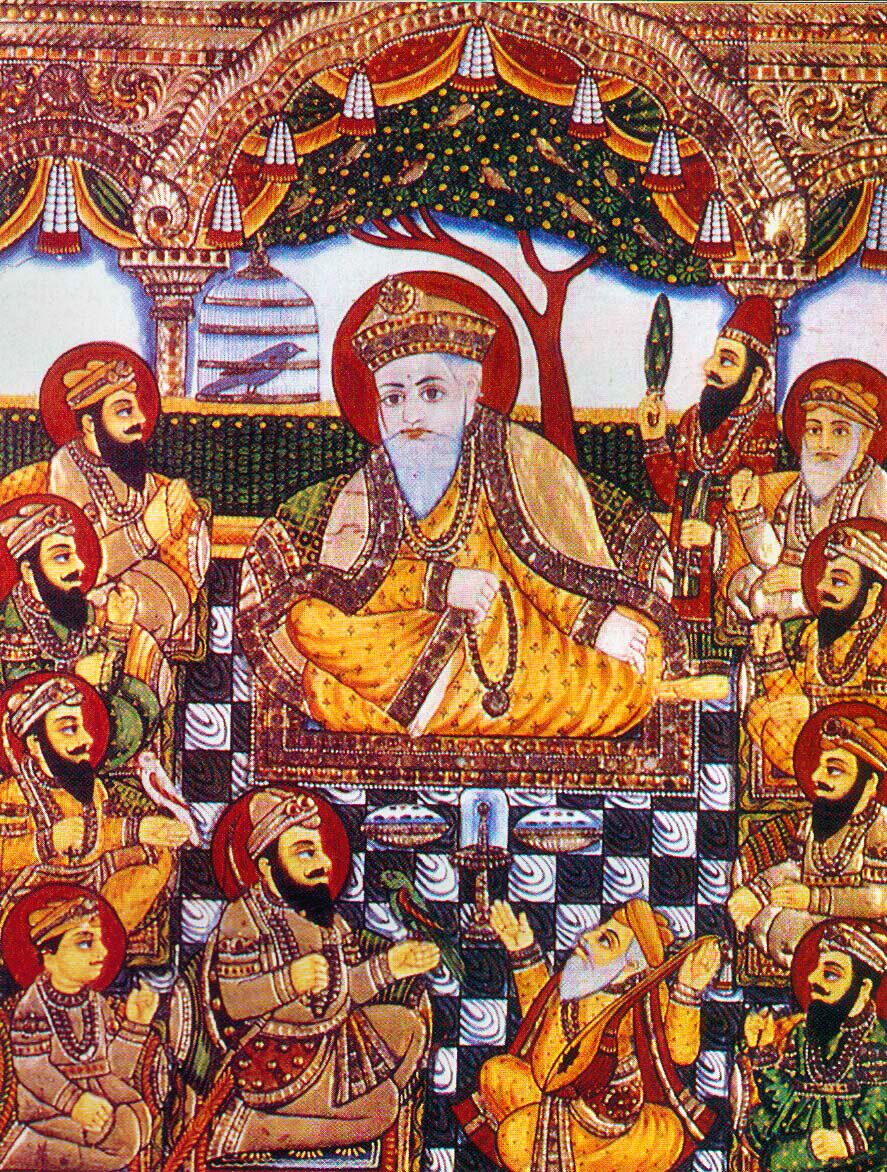
A Thanjavur painting of the ten Sikh Gurus with Bhai Bala and Bhai Mardana – 20th century

Thanjavur paintings are panel paintings done on wooden planks, and hence referred to as palagai padam (palagai = "wooden plank"; padam = "picture") in local parlance. In modern times, these paintings have become souvenirs for festive occasions in South India.

== Style and technique ==
Thanjavur paintings were made in various sizes depending upon the function, the subject and the choice of the patron. Large paintings of deities and the Maratha rulers, their courtiers and nobility, were painted and installed to serve as architectural accents in the Maratha palaces and buildings. To quote Dallapiccola – "The works, executed on canvas pasted on a wooden support, were framed – a major departure from the pan-Indian tradition, in which paintings are of small size – and designed to be hung on the walls of domestic puja rooms or in bhajan halls. The themes, as in painted albums, (made for European patrons) were usually gods and goddesses, holy places, religious personalities and occasionally portraits. Their dazzling palette consisted generally of vivid reds, deep greens, chalk white, turquoise blues and the lavish use of gold (foil) and inset glass beads. Sometimes precious stones were also used in the paintings. The large format of the majority of such works and the relatively simple composition are the hallmark of the style. This school was greatly inspired by European techniques and was the most popular in Tamil Nadu until the early twentieth century."

Paintings in addition to being done on canvas, were also done on walls, wooden panel, glass, paper, mica and exotic media such as ivory. Small Ivory portraits were typically worn as cameo pendants called rajaharam and were quite popular.

Thanjavur glass paintings following the techniques of Chinese reverse glass paintings were popularised during Serfoji II's reign as a cheaper and faster craft. The paintings were done on the reverse surface of a glass sheet with strips of metal beaten into transparent gaps to simulate the effect of jewellery and precious stones. Most of the paintings were of Hindu deities & saints. Other courtly and secular portraits were also created.

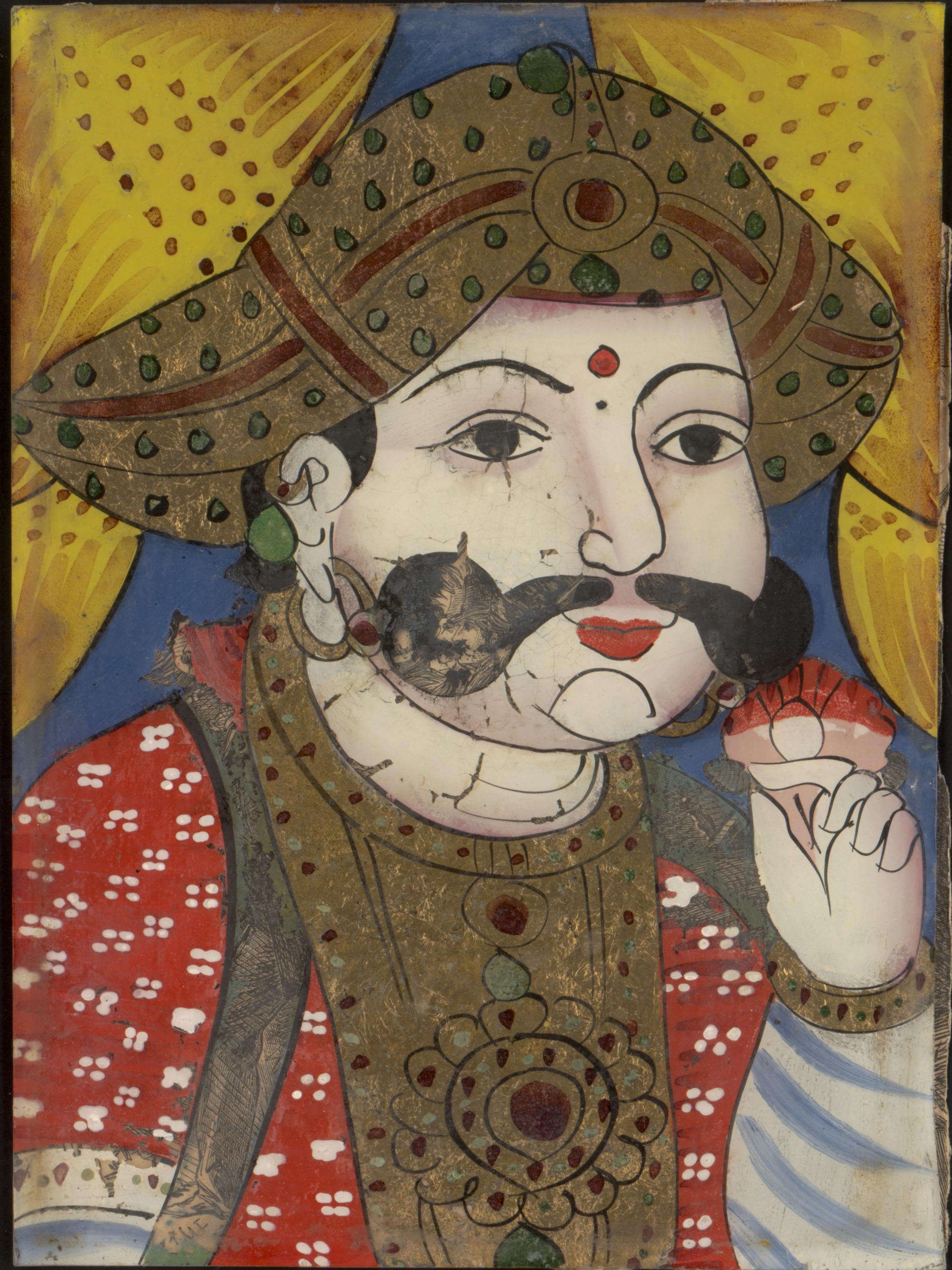
Tanjore Glass painting of Raja Sarabhoji, c. 1860

A Thanjavur Painting was generally made on a canvas pasted over a plank of wood (Jackfruit or teak) with Arabic gum. The canvas was then evenly coated with a paste of French chalk (gopi) or powdered limestone and a binding medium and dried. The artist then drew or traced using a stencil, a detailed outline of the main and subsidiary subjects on the canvas. A paste, made of limestone powder and a binding medium called sukkan or makku, was used for creating the Gesso work. Gold leaves and gems of varied hues were inlaid in selected areas like pillars, arches, thrones, dresses, etc. Finally, colours were applied on the sketch.

In the past, artists used natural colours like vegetable and mineral dyes, whereas the present day artists use chemical paints. For outlines dark brown or red was usually used. Red was favoured for the background, though blue and green were also used. Lord Vishnu, was coloured blue, and Lord Nataraja chalk white, and his consort Goddess Sivakami was green. The sky, of course, was blue, but black was also employed on occasions. The portrayal of figures in the paintings was also typical with almost all the figures having rounded faces with almond-shaped eyes and smooth, streamlined bodies. The composition is static and two-dimensional with the figures placed within arches, curtains, and decorative borders. The main subject is much larger than the other subjects and occupies the centre of the painting. Seraphs or angels resembling those in European paintings and Islamic miniatures were also shown flanking the main figure. The figures were painted with bright flat colours except for the face where shading was shown. The shading in Thanjavur art was more to create a feeling of depth than to conform to the European conventions of lighting and perspective.

There are some examples of this art in the Saraswathi Mahal Library, in Tanjore built by Serfoji II. The Sanskrit work Prabotha Chandrodayam in the library has a few pages of Tanjore art as also Marathi translations of Mahabharata & Bhagavatham in which are found the works of the painter Madhava swami dated 1824 AD. Faint traces of Maratha style paintings inset with glass are found on the walls of the Thiruvaiyaru Chatram built by Serfoji after his pilgrimage to Kashi. Many other buildings in and around Thanjavur have fine examples of the paintings on the roofs and walls, though many are gradually disappearing and dying due to serious neglect and acts of vandalism.

The Government Museum, Chennai and the Thanjavur Art Gallery, Thanjavur also house fine collections of Thanjavur paintings depicting the Maratha kings of Thanjavur and other allied subjects. Many private museums and collectors also possess enviable collections of Thanjavur paintings.

The British and Victoria & Albert museums in England also house a large collection of Thanjavur paintings in the company and traditional styles. The National Museum of Copenhagen also houses a fine collection of 17th century Thanjavur paintings. King Christian IV of Denmark had received permission to build a fort at Tranquebar (Tharangambadi in Tamil) which led to the building of the Danesborg fort as also a Danish relationship with Thanjavur which resulted in the museum collection.

== Influences ==
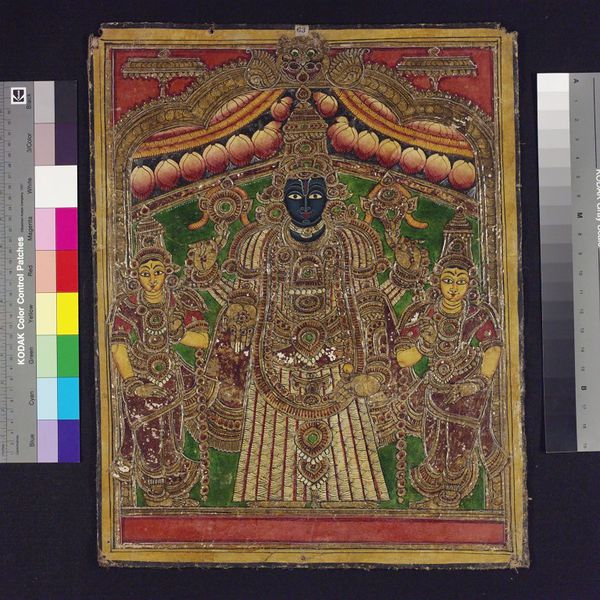
Tirupati painting of Lord Venkateshwarar in the collection of the Victoria and Albert Museum, London

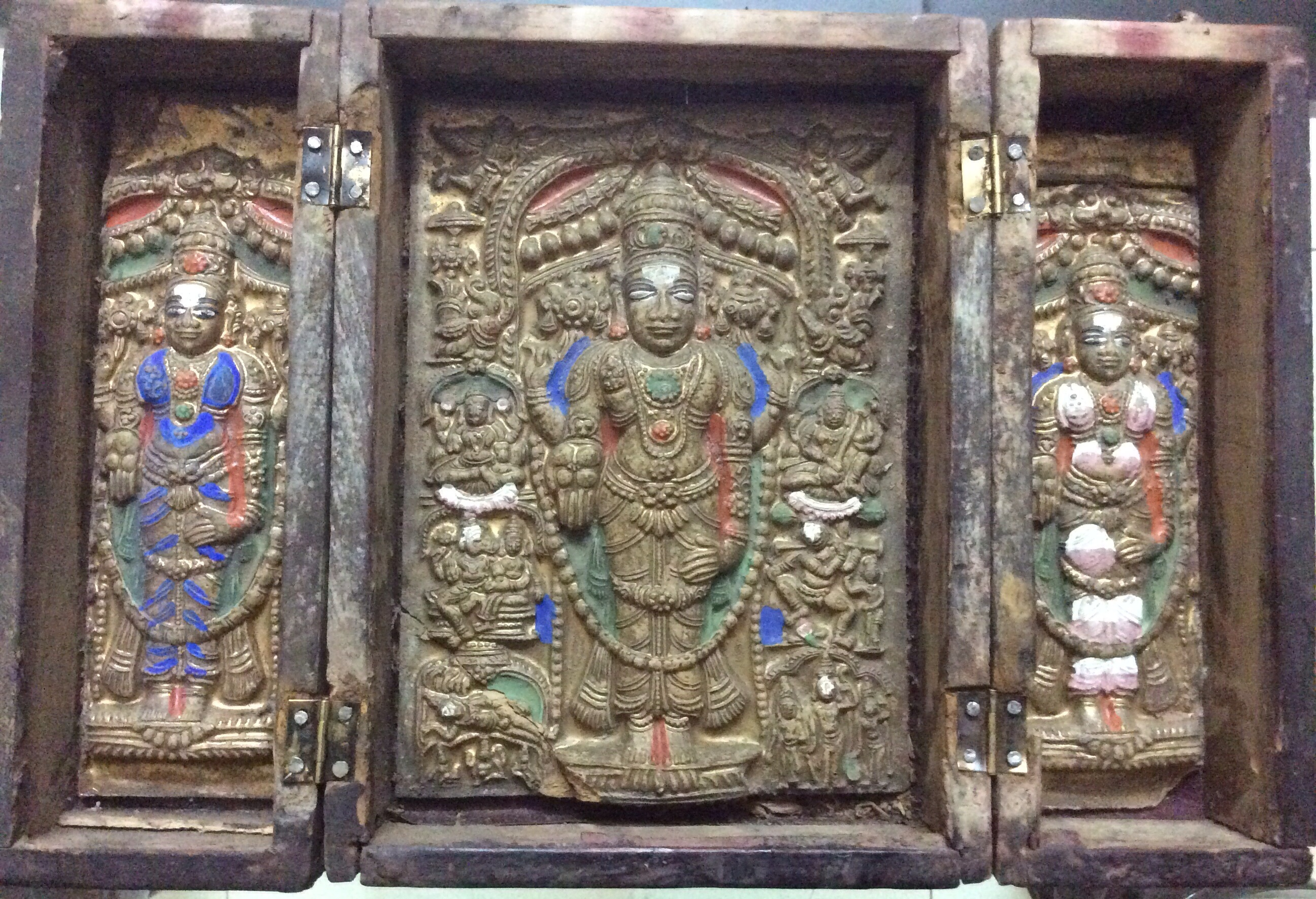
A portable wooden shrine carrying painted terracotta plaques of Tirupati Venkateswarar and consorts – circa 19th century CE

Thanjavur houses the 11th century Chola wall paintings in the Brihadeeswarar temple as also paintings from the Nayak period (many times superimposed on the earlier Chola paintings) dating to the 16th century. In 1521–22, Krishnadevaraya travelled to the Tamil country visiting holy places and as was his wont, made munificent donations to temples and other religious establishments. It can be surmised that some of this munificence was also channeled into art and artists. The fall of the Vijayanagara Empire and the sack of Hampi in the Battle of Talikota in 1565 CE resulted in the migration of painters who had been dependent on the patronage of the empire. Some of them migrated to Thanjavur and worked under the patronage of the Thanjavur Nayakas. The Thanjavur Nayaka line commenced with Sevappa Nayaka (1532–72). Sevappa ruled for several years, ably supported by his son Achyutappa (1564–1614), who later succeeded him. It was during Achyutappa's reign that the Vijayanagara empire fell, leading to the exodus of numerous litterateurs, philosophers, musicians and artists who migrated to several other neighbouring kingdoms like Mysore and Thanjavur. Achyutappa was succeeded by his son Raghunatha Nayaka who in turn was succeeded by Vijayaraghava Nayaka. Raghunatha, who was possibly the most successful Thanjavur Nayaka ruler, was also a great patron of art and artists and helped establish the unique school of Thanjavur artists who later evolved the Thanjavur style of paintings under the Marathas. Subsequently, the Maratha rulers who defeated the Thanjavur Nayakas began to nurture the Thanjavur atelier. The artists absorbed the local influences and the individual tastes of their Maratha patrons which helped evolve the unique Thanjavur style of painting. The Thanjavur artists in addition to decorating temples also began painting and decorating the major buildings, palaces, chatrams and residences of the Maratha kings and nobility. The Tanjore style of paintings spring from a late phase of South Indian classical art, when the society in which it originated was itself going through turbulent times. Needless to say, Tanjore paintings are informed by a syncretic style, notable for its assimilation of the contemporary diverse cultural influences – Tamil, Telugu, Maratha, European, Deccani, Folk, etc. The style drew heavily from the other major South Indian styles of painting which were all deeply influenced by the Vijayanagara school. The closest influences among these could be the Kalamkari and Tirupati paintings.

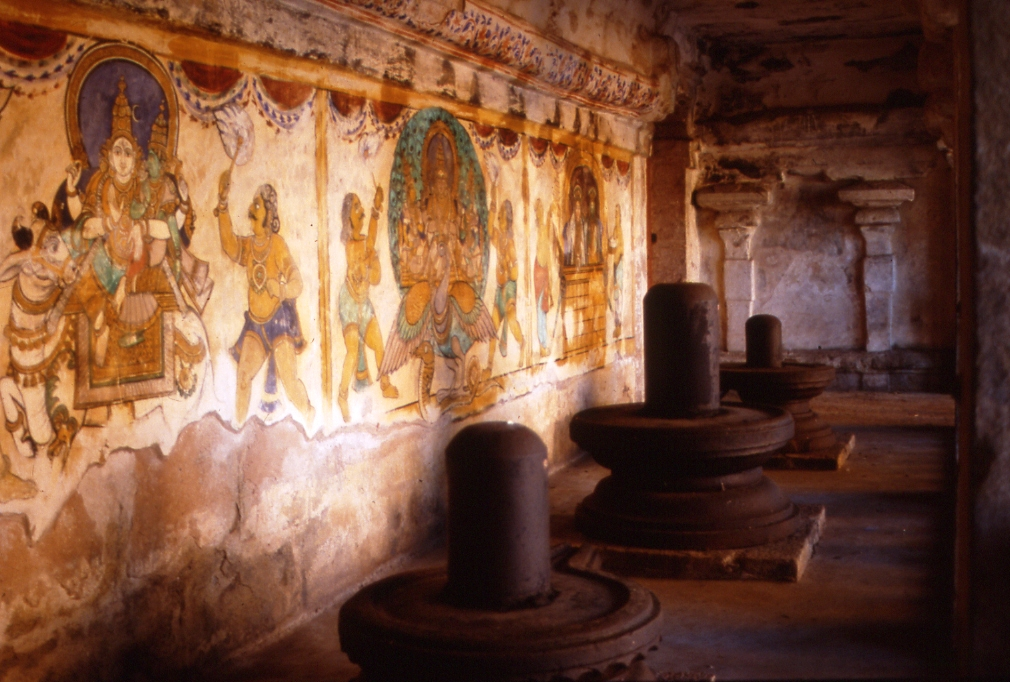
Nayaka period paintings in the Peruvudaiyar Koil

Tirupati paintings, in particular were produced in the famous temple town using different media and techniques, like painted terracotta reliefs, brass repousse works, paintings on paper and canvas, etc. The commonest examples were painted and gilded terracotta relief slabs of the deity, framed and packaged in neat wooden boxes which could be carried back as holy memorabilia and worshipped in the Puja room by the pilgrim-devotee. Paintings of the main deity, gilded and gem-set, in a manner similar to Tanjore paintings are also known.

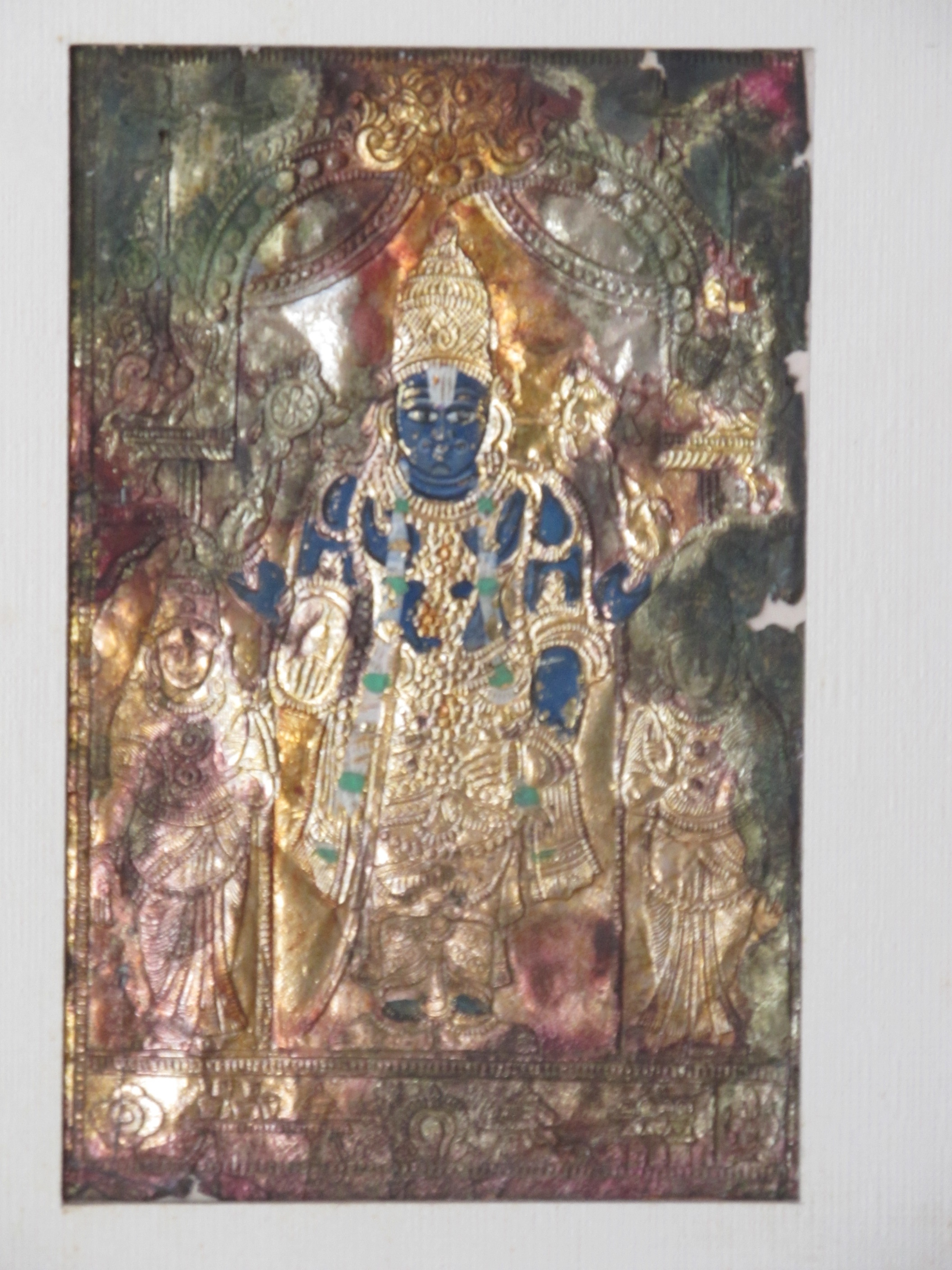
A painted brass repousse of Tirupati Balaji. Circa 19th century CE.

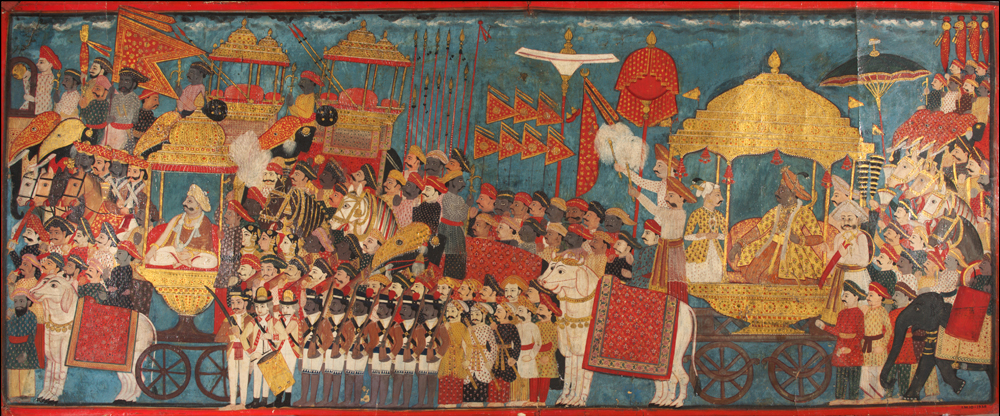
Processional scene with Amar Singh, ruler of Thanjavur (1787–98) and Sarabhoji (1798–1832) – note the gilded chariots being pulled by bulls.

Tanjore paintings were also closely related to the crafts of painted and carved wood on the one hand and gilded, stone set jewellery work which flourished in Thanjavur. It is also pertinent to remember that Thanjavur art was functional, in that it was made for a specific purpose on a specific demand from a customer. And it is also in the same context that one understands the iconic style of Thanjavur paintings in contrast to say, the Pahari miniatures or even Surpur paintings.

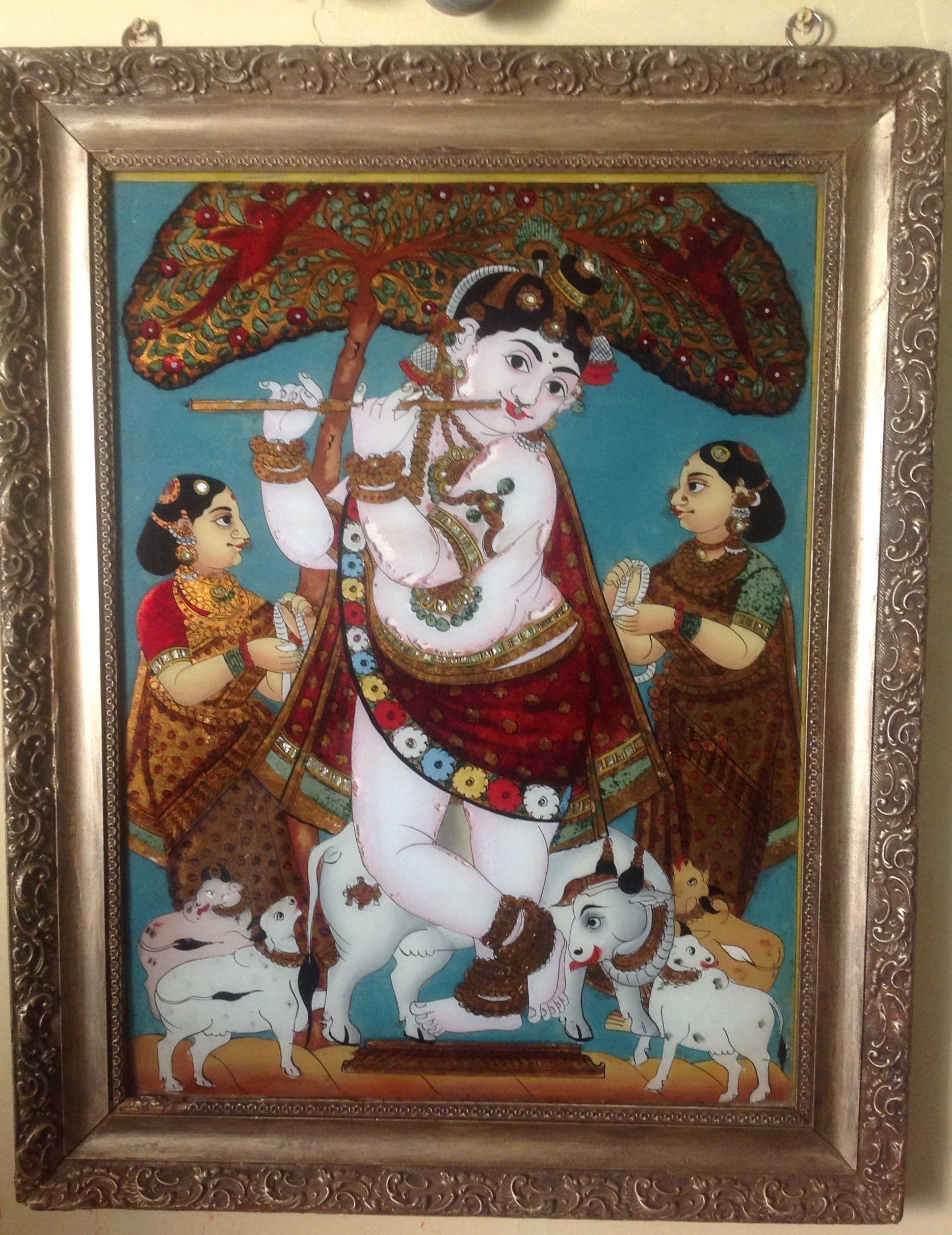
A Tanjore Glass painting of Venugopala Krishna flanked by Gopikas

By the time Serfoji II succeeded to the Maratha throne in Thanjavur, the Britishers had taken over the complete administration of the state, retaining the king in only a nominal capacity to exercise power over the fort and a smidgen of surrounding lands. Though Serfoji II had to fight off a spirited competition from Amarasimha, his paternal uncle, to the Maratha throne of Thanjavur, it was during his reign that Thanjavur painting flourished and reached the form and style in which we recognise it today.

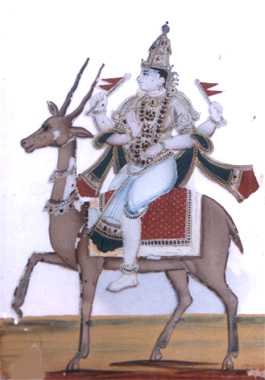
A Tanjore painting of Vayu on mica in the collection of Government Museum, Chennai

The Maratha rule came to a sad end after the death of its last ruler Shivaji II, (resembling only in name his vastly greater ancestor) who died without a male issue, when the Britishers obliged by annexing the Thanjavur state to its dominions under the notorious Doctrine of Lapse. After the Maratha rule waned, the mercantile Chettiar community continued to patronise the Thanjavur artists. The Chettiars being staunch Shaivites encouraged Shaivite themes. One of their monasteries in Koviloor has large Thanjavur paintings on the lives of the 63 Nayanmars (Saivaite saints) and the 64 miracles (Thiruvilaiyadal Puranam) of Lord Shiva minutely labelled in Tamil. Similarly, the Bhimarajagoswami monastery in Thanjavur has a large painting of 108 Vishnu temples. The Britishers who had come into Thanjavur in the wake of the Anglo-Mysore wars also patronised Thanjavur artists and their paintings.

== Artists ==
Tanjore paintings were painted by 'Moochys or Artists of India' according to the British chronicler Charles Gold in his book Oriental Drawings published in 1806. Traditionally, it is well known that the Raju community of Thanjavur and Tiruchi, also called as Jinigara or Chitragara and the Nayudu community of Madurai were the artists who executed paintings in the Thanjavur style. The artists (Rajus & Naidus) were originally Telugu speaking people from the artistically vibrant Rayalaseema region of Andhra, who moved to Tamil Nadu in the wake of the fall of the Vijayanagara empire and the establishment of Nayak rule in Madurai and Thanjavur.

The artists turned out a wide repertoire of paintings on different subjects and of varied quality depending upon the patron's interest, urgency and most importantly influence and financial capacity. However, the art was by and large a sacred task to be performed with a reasonable degree of ritual purity and humility by the master craftsmen, many of whom chose to remain anonymous and never signed their paintings, true to the Indian artistic tradition. However a few works signed by the Thanjavur artists are also known. C. Kondiah Raju, the famous calendar artist from Kovilpatti, was one of the illustrious descendants to make a name as an artist during modern times from the Raju community.

== Tanjore and Mysore paintings ==
Tanjore and Mysore paintings, both spring from the same source – Vijayanagara paintings to begin with and Nayaka paintings subsequently. The very same artists, Chitragars and Naidus migrated to various places including Thanjavur and Mysore. This is the reason for the remarkable degree of similarity between the two styles. However, there are many differences that can be made out by the discerning viewer.

The differences are largely in the techniques used to create these artworks and in their distinct iconography. The techniques adopted by the Mysore artists are slightly different from those of the Tanjore School. While Tanjore School used white lime powder and powdered tamarind seeds with gum arabic on cloth stretched on wooden panels, Mysore artists used white lead powder (Makhisafeda) or Makhi Gamboge (yellow) drawn from the juice of the indigenous tree (Revana Chinni halu) on paper. The paper sometimes was pasted to a wooden board, but mostly was framed as it was. As against the high relief of the Tanjore 'Gesso' work used prominently across large areas of the painting, the Mysore school preferred low relief, in selected areas such as jewellery, clothing, and borders. The Mysore school used pure gold leaf in lesser quantity as against gold-coated silver leaf handled across larger areas in the painting by Tanjore artists. The use of glass beads, precious and semi precious stones is also very rare in Mysore paintings. More elaborate and detailed interior and exterior landscapes are featured in Mysore paintings, whereas Tanjore paintings tend to be more iconic and static. In Mysore paintings, the jewellery, costumes, architectural features, furniture, etc. reflect the contemporary style prevalent in the Mysore Palace. The throne on which Gods and Goddesses are shown seated is usually a replica of the Mysore throne in many Mysore paintings.

Both styles however, frequently show traditional temple pavilions (prabhavalis) and towers particularly for framing the main characters. However the geographical proximity, constant transmigration of artists and a heavy cross fertilisation of ideas and techniques ensured that one could see Tanjore paintings employing Mysore techniques and vice versa.

== Tanjore paintings in Company style ==
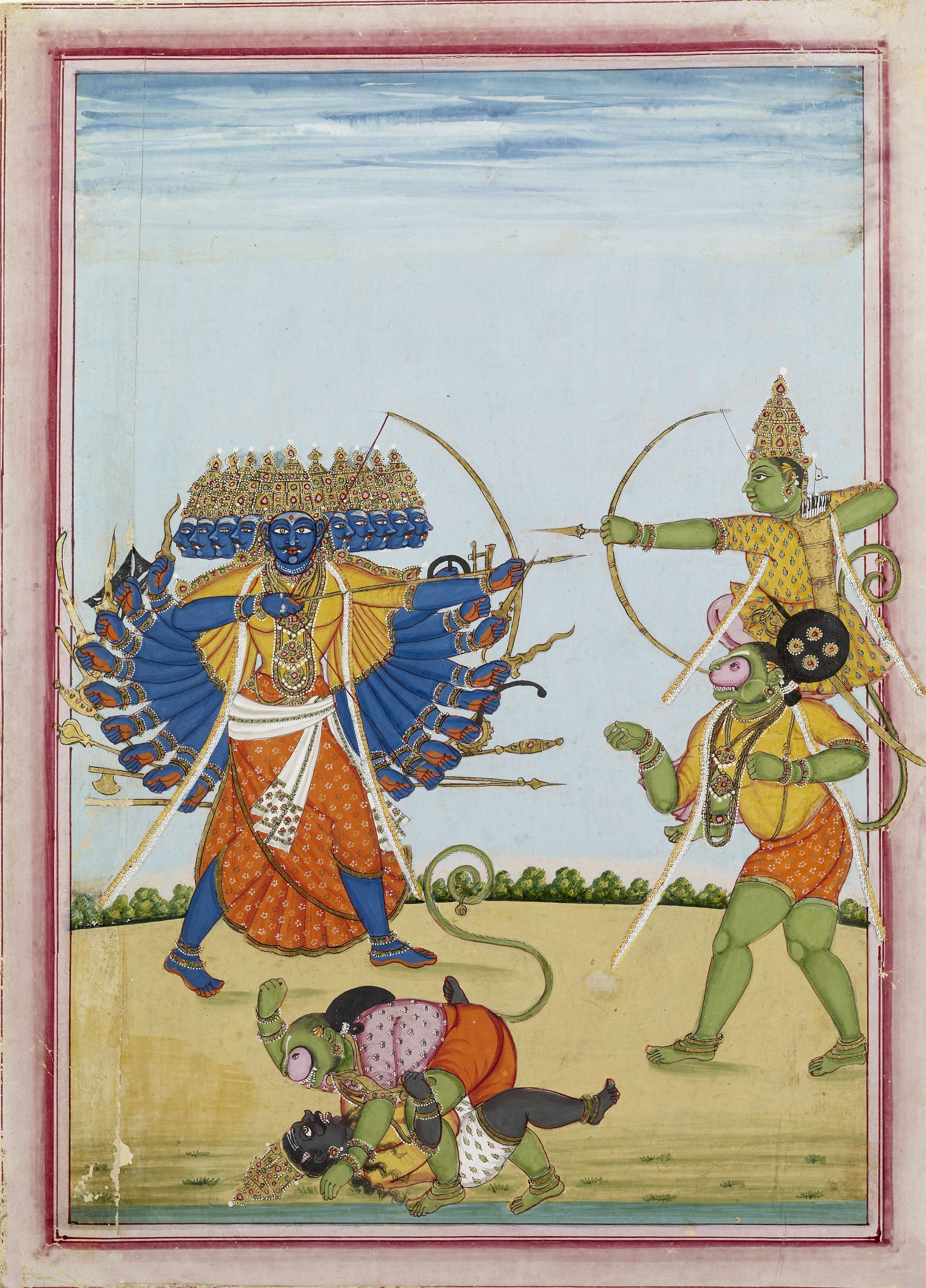
Rama and Hanuman fighting Ravana, an album painting on paper, c. 1820 – British Museum Collection

Many of the traditional Indian artists were also patronised by Europeans, beginning with the Portuguese who landed on the west coast in 1498. Gradually the other Europeans followed suit and commissioned local artists to paint in the so-called company style. While no specific character or technique marked out the Company school of paintings, it can be understood to mean the large body of paintings painted by Indian artists in a mixed Indo-European style which would appeal to the Europeans who were employed by the various East India Companies.

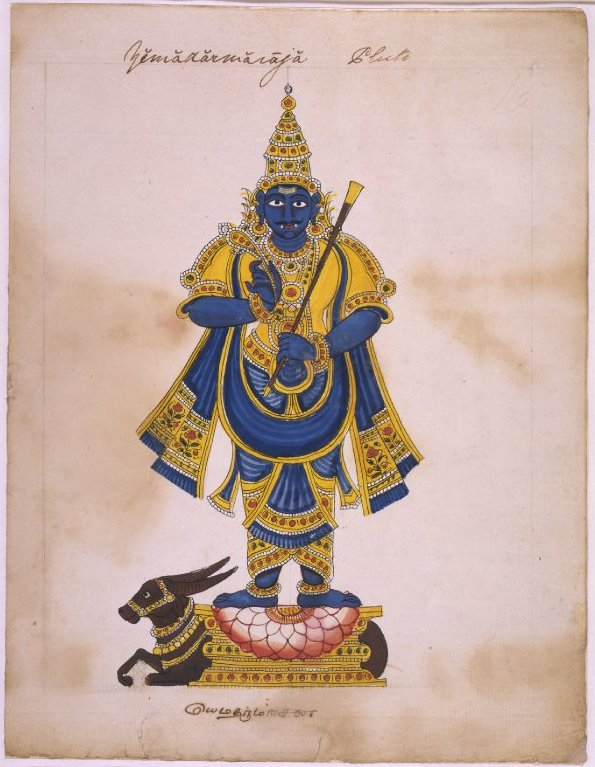
The deity Yama with fangs and holding a daṇḍa (a rod), watermarked, 1814 – British Museum Collection

The direct European impact on Tanjore paintings began with the stationing of a British garrison in Thanjavur in 1773, during the Anglo-Mysore Wars of 1767–99. Throughout the nineteenth century, artists based in and around Thanjavur prepared, by and large a standard sets of paintie sets were called albums or album paintings and were a collection of 'native' or 'Indian' subjects of interest, suited to the English sensibilities and tastes. Common subjects were Gods and Goddesses, episodes from Hindu mythology; Fairs, ceremonies, processions and festivals; Castes, their occupations and dresses; Indian Flora and Fauna, etc. These paintings were executed by the same Tanjore artists in a style suited to western tastes. The paintings were usually executed on European paper, without gesso work, little or no Gold foil and without any glass or gem inlay. The paintings would also carry a brief description ( most times extremely quaint and so typically English) of the subject in English and sometimes in Tamil or Telugu. Paintings on cloth backed by wooden panels were also executed for the English patrons. Many of these were carried to England where they probably enlivened many an evening tea! The British Museum and The Victoria and Albert Museum have an enviable collection of such paintings.

Though the British patronised paintings tend to be grouped under the Company style of paintings, they were Tanjore paintings in spirit. In addition to being executed by the same traditional group of artists in Thanjavur and the neighbouring Tamil country, the style and characterisation in these paintings are very typically Thanjavur as against the style of say, Company paintings executed in Calcutta or Lucknow.

== Modern times ==
Thanjavur paintings continue to be made even to the present day, though not with the rigour and virtuosity that marked the paintings of yore. 'Revival' programmes, Exhibitions, Workshops and Training camps on Thanjavur paintings are being held regularly by many institutions including State Governments. The materials used have also changed according to the cost, ease of availability and the choice of individual artists. Plywood, for example has by and large replaced Jack and teak wood. Synthetic colours and adhesives are preferred over the natural and mineral colours and other traditional components. Muck powder, a fine powder of chalk, is also used to create a 3D effect in the paintings. In addition to the traditional subjects, a wide range of popular and modern subjects and themes are being depicted in Thanjavur paintings. While it is a happy development that this traditional art continues to hold its sway, the brazen commercialisation and lack of aesthetics are disturbing trends. Be that as it may, Thanjavur paintings – the style and aesthetics continue to inspire many contemporary artists. The Calendar prints of C. Kondiah Raju and his student followers, marked by an iconic solidness as against the western naturalism of Raja Ravi Varma, are examples of the continued influence of Tanjore paintings in modern, popular and academic art.

Artists have taken this old form of art and over the years combined it with other styles to create mixed media arts. For example, tanjores are also done on mirrors, glass and canvas. The idea of applying gold foil is unique to this traditional art, so this same style is taken and recreated on different mediums.
