= Umabai Kundapur =

Indian freedom fighter (1891–1992)

Head of the women's wing of the Seva Dal

Personal details
- Born: 25 March 1892 Hubballi, Karnataka
- Died: 1992
- Party: Indian National Congress

Umabai Kundapur was an Indian freedom fighter from Karnataka, known for her leadership in the women's wing of the Seva Dal, a grassroots organization founded by N. S. Hardikar that played a significant role in India’s struggle for independence.

== Personal life ==
Umabai Kundapur was born as Bhavani Golikeri to Golikeri Krishna Rao and Jungabai in Mangalore in the year 1892. Umabai married Sanjeeva Rao Kundapur in 1905 at the age of 13. She came from a large family, having five brothers.

Umabai was inspired to join the Indian independence movement after witnessing the procession of Bal Gangadhar Tilak's funeral on August 1st, 1920. When Mahatma Gandhi announced the Non-Cooperation Movement on September 4th, 1920, Umabai, along with her brother Raghurama Rao and husband Sanjeeva Rao, decided to participate in the movement. She encouraged women to get involved and also wrote and performed several plays centered around the movement, aiming to inspire others to join the cause.

After the death of her husband, Sanjeeva Rao Kundapur, from tuberculosis on March 28th, 1923, Umabai returned to Hubli with her father-in-law. During this time, Ananda Rao established the Karnataka Press in Hubli. Upon her return, Umabai became involved with the Seva Dal (HSD), an organization founded by Narayan Subbarao Hardikar in 1923 to motivate Indian youth to participate in the independence movement. Umabai was later elected as the leader of the women's wing. She also took on the responsibility of overseeing the Tilak Kanya School, which had been established by Hardikar.

As a participant in the independence movement, Umabai was arrested by the British government in 1932 and imprisoned in Yerawada jail for four months. During her imprisonment, she received the news of her father-in-law Ananda Rao's death. Sarojini Naidu, who was also imprisoned at the time, offered support and advised Umabai to continue her political activities covertly. After her release, Umabai found that the British government had taken control of the Karnataka Press and shut down the Tilak Kanya School. Additionally, Bhagini Mandal, an organization founded by Ananda Rao, was banned. Despite these challenges, Umabai continued to provide refuge to freedom fighters at her home.

During the Quit India Movement in 1942, Umabai’s home became a shelter for many underground freedom fighters, whom she provided with food and accommodation while they evaded the British authorities.

== Bibliography ==
- Shintri, Sarojini (1983). Women Freedom Fighters in Karnataka (1st ed.). Karnataka: Prasaranga, Karnatak University. pp. 3 Sep 2008. ISBN 978-0836414851.
