= N. S. Hardikar =

Indian politician (1889 – 1975)

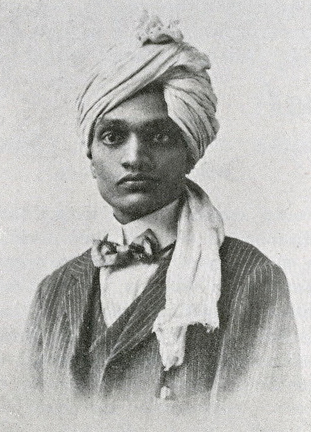
Photo of Hardikar from the November 1915 issue of The Hindusthanee Student

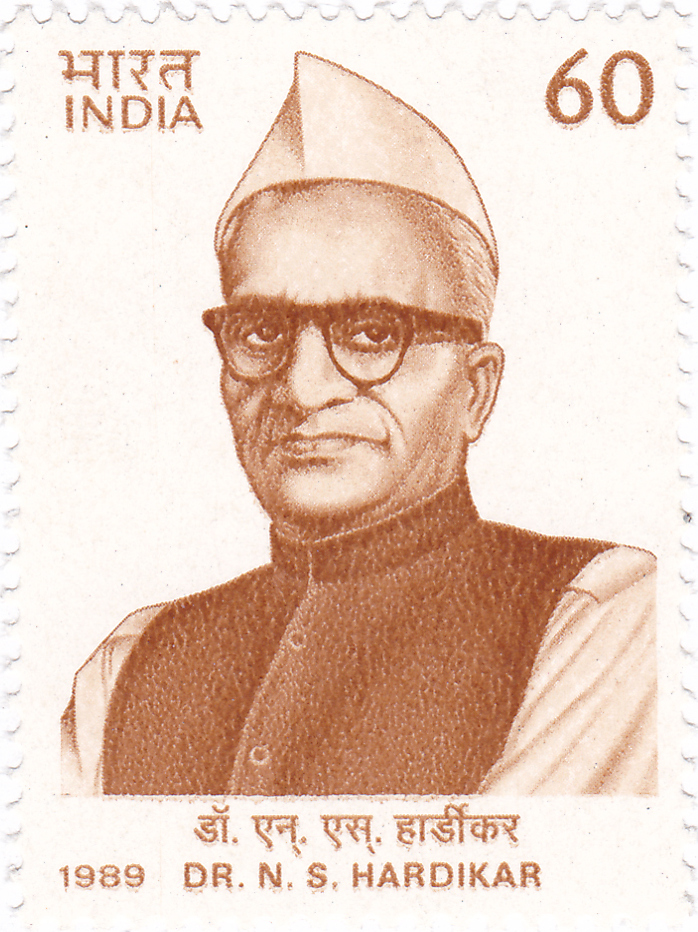
Hardikar on a 1989 stamp of India

Narayan Subbarao Hardikar (7 May 1889 – 26 August 1975) was a freedom fighter and Congress politician who founded the Congress Seva Dal.

== Biography ==
=== Early life ===
Hardikar was born in Dharwar in 1889 to Subbarao and Yamunabai. He studied medicine at the College of Physicians and Surgeons, Calcutta and then went to the United States for higher education.

=== Years in America ===
In 1916, he completed his M.Sc in Public Health from the University of Michigan. During his years in America, Hardikar met and became a close associate of Lala Lajpat Rai. As Rai's colleague, Hardikar became an active participant in many political activities in America. He was secretary of the Home Rule League and helped organise the Indian Workers Union of America. As office bearers of the Home Rule League, Rai and Hardikar addressed the US Senate’s Foreign Relations Committee. He was also president of the Hindustan Association of America. Hardikar's pamphlet India – A Graveyard was extensively discussed in several newspapers and journals. He was managing editor of the journal Young India which Senator France of Maryland on the Foreign Relations Committee observed, had rendered "a valuable service in acquainting the people of America with the grave problems which confronted the people of India".

=== Return to India ===
Hardikar returned to India in 1921. During the Flag Satyagraha of 1923, Hardikar and his Hubli Seva Mandal gained national prominence after they refused to apologise to the British authorities to gain a commutation in their prison sentences. This resistance prompted the Congress to set up an organisation along the lines of the Mandal to groom a band of volunteers to combat the British Raj. During the Kakinada Congress session of 1923 a 13-member committee under Hardikar was formed to look at the establishment of such an organisation. The Hindustani Seva Mandal was thus formed in 1923 and later rechristened the Seva Dal. Dr Hardikar was elected general secretary of the Karnataka Pradesh Congress Committee and published the monthly journal Volunteer.

=== The Seva Dal ===
The Seva Dal was formed in 1923 following the Kakinada session of the Congress in 1923. Although Jawaharlal Nehru supported Hardikar, the idea of forming a militia like organisation faced much resistance from Congressman who feared it would lead to the erosion of civilian authority within the party and who argued that it contravened the principle of non-violence. The Dal played a stellar role in the Civil Disobedience Movement, organising mass picketing and enrollment of new members into the Congress party. The significance of the Dal in the Civil Disobedience Movement can be gauged from the fact that in 1934, when the Movement came to an end and the colonial authorities lifted the ban on the Congress and its organisations, they continued to proscribe the Dal. The Seva Dal became the central volunteer organisation of the Congress and focused attention on imparting its volunteers physical training and worked towards promoting communal amity.

=== Post-Independence ===
Dr Hardikar helped found the Karnatak Health Institute at Ghataprabha. He was a two-term Rajya Sabha MP from 1952 to 1962 and was conferred the Padma Bhushan in 1958. Dr Hardikar died on 26 August 1975. To commemorate his birth centenary, the Department of Posts issued a commemorative stamp in his honour in 1989.
