= Srinivas B. V. =

Indian politician

Srinivas BV
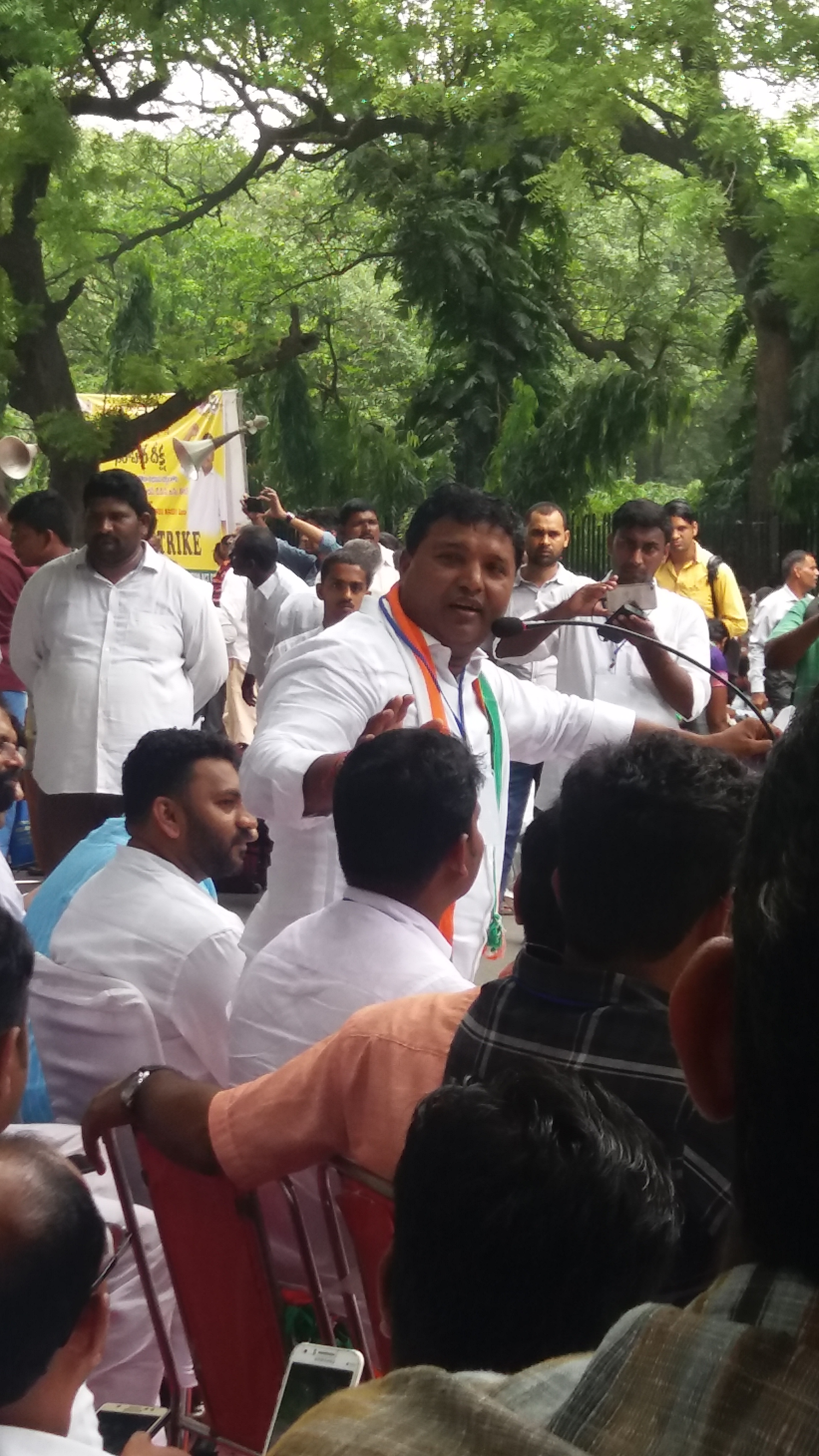

Chief Organizer of INC Seva Dal
- Incumbent
- Assumed office 26 June 2026
- Preceded by: Lalji Desai

Former President of Indian Youth Congress
- In office July 2019 – 22 September 2024
- Preceded by: Keshav Chand Yadav
- Succeeded by: Uday Bhanu Chib

Personal details
- Born: 8 November 1980 (age 45)
- Party: Indian National Congress

Srinivas Bhadravathi Venkata is an Indian politician from Shimoga district of Karnataka. He was former National President of the Indian Youth Congress. He was a cricket player who had played for under-19 and under-16 Karnataka cricket team. He was in the news for his online responses and relief works with along his associates during the COVID-19 pandemic in Delhi.

== Political career ==
Srinivas who hails from a non-political middle-class family, started his political career as a NSUI member during his college days at National College, Bangalore. Later he became a block president of the Indian Youth Congress followed by positions at district level and state level.

He rose into publicity in 2010 when a group of Congress workers along with him mounted a protest against Pramod Muthalik, a staunch right wing activist in Coastal Karnataka and smeared black paint on his face for Muthalik's vitriolic stand against Valentine's Day celebrations. He faced disciplinary actions from Karnataka Pradesh Congress Committee following this. However, in October 2010 he received 'Best Youth Congress Worker' award from Rahul Gandhi.

He held the post of National Secretary, IYC, followed by National General Secretary, IYC, and its vice president in 2018. In July 2019 he was appointed president of the Indian Youth Congress when Keshav Chand Yadav resigned from this post after Lok Sabha elections. Under his leadership IYC organized 'National Unemployment Day' on September 17, the birthday of Narendra Modi.

=== COVID relief ===
In the first wave of COVID-19 pandemic in India he set up facilities to help Migrant workers from Uttar Pradesh and Bihar to reach back home using Shramik Special trains.

During the second wave of COVID-19 pandemic in India he became one of the most visible help provider for government and non government bodies by facilitating emergency supplies of essential drugs and oxygen. He coordinated a group of 1000 Indian Youth Congress(IYC) volunteers in Delhi for COVID-19 relief. There were instances when Diplomatic mission (embassies) of New Zealand and Philippines reached out to IYC team for COVID-19 relief. There were political spat over this relief works but Srinivas categorically stated that he is into relief and not into pandemic politics.

In May 2021, Delhi Police questioned him on COVID-19 relief distribution alleging hoarding. However Indian National Congress came out in support of him and criticized Bharatiya Janata Party for unleashing political vendetta against those helping people in need. In a report filed by Delhi Police before Delhi High Court they said that Srinivas and team are actually helping people voluntarily without any discrimination and there is no black marketing happening under the garb of volunteering.

== Allegations of harassment ==
Angkita Dutta, Assam president of Indian Youth Congress, accused him of harassment after which she was expelled from the All India Congress Committee due to "anti party activities". Srinivas was summoned by Assam Police in the matter.

== Positions held ==
- Vice President - Indian Youth Congress 2018-2019
- President - Indian Youth Congress 2019-2024
- Chief Organizer - Seva Dal 2026

== See also ==
- Zeeshan Siddique
- Sonu Sood
