= V. Balu =

V. Balu

Dr. Venkatraman Balu (6 December 1928 – 13 September 2007) was an internationally known artist from Bangalore, India. He worked with paper collages and toured the world for 25 years promoting peace through art. His ASK ("Antar Shanti Kala" or the "Art of Inner Peace") initiative allowed people of different ages and cultures to experience the power of art and the role of each individual in promoting peace. He wrote seven books on peace including works for children.

== Career and inspiration ==
Beginning his career as an artist by drawing cartoons and later moving on to oil paintings, Balu discovered his fascination with paper and its infinite possibilities. In the process of creating his intriguing pieces, he also discovered its potential to provide that elusive inner peace.

From 1982 he travelled internationally sharing his thoughts on "inner peace" and the "role of individuals in global peace" with individuals and groups. The media in different parts of the world have dubbed his work a "one man global peace mission through art" and "a one man brigade for inner peace". V.Balu spoke at the Dag Hammerskjold Auditorium of the U.N and at the Headquarters of UNESCO in Paris. He gave peace presentations to audiences in Belgium, Germany, Mexico, Canada, Australia, New Zealand, Sri Lanka, the UAE, South Africa and India.

He wrote popular science articles, spiritual columns and newspaper articles as well as spiritual books and cartoons. He wrote eight books on "Inner Peace". Three of these books titled "Sadaa Shanti" (Perpetual Peace), "Shanti Darshan" (Messengers of Peace) and "Shanti Sopana" (Steps to Peace) form part of the Bharatiya Vidya Bhavan Book University series. His book for children "Peace + Children = Peaceful Children" has been translated into Kannada and Telugu and is in school libraries in Karnataka and Andhra Pradesh. His work "Peace Lollipops for Tiny Tots". contains original peace rhymes, available with recordings of the rhymes set to music.

== Death ==
The artist, who was 79, died of head injuries when he was hit by a two-wheeler. On 13 September 2007, while returning after attending a function at the Indian Institute of World Culture, the septuagenarian was knocked down by the two-wheeler and he succumbed to his injuries.
The following rhyme was performed at his funeral : Peace peace peace
Please please please
We want peace
Not pieces please

== Honors ==
- Honorary doctorate from Bangalore University (Jan 2006)
- Key to the City of Ojai, California
- UNESCO Bronze medal
- State award (Rajyothsava) from Karnataka State, India
- Artwork used on covers of leading magazines such as Reader's Digest
- Artwork used on UNICEF greeting cards and calendars
- Rajyotsava Award.
