= P. Selvie Das =

Indian educationist and parliamentarian

Dr. P. Selvie Das (1932–2021) was a former Indian educationist and parliamentarian.

Dr. Das was the Vice-Chancellor of the University of Mysore (1988–1991) and a member of the Union Public Service Commission (1991–1997). She was nominated to the Rajya Sabha in 1997 and served till 2003.

Das died in 2021 from COVID-19.

== Sources ==
- Brief Biodata
