= S. M. Pandit =

Indian painter from Karnataka (1916–1993)

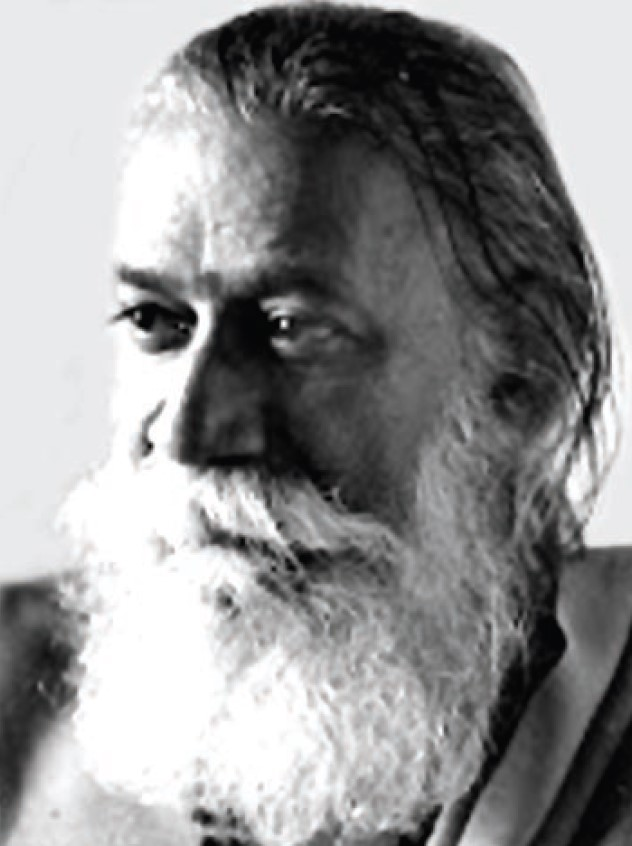
- Born: 25 March 1916
- Died: 30 March 1993 (aged 77)
- Known for: Painting

Sambanand Monappa Pandit (25 March 1916 – 30 March 1993) was an Indian painter from Karnataka, popular in the school of Realism in contrast to the contemporaneous net-traditionalist Bengal Renaissance and other Indian modern art movements of his time. Most of his subjects oscillated between events from classical Indian literature including the Ramayana, the Mahabharata, the Puranas, and the contemporary cinema of his times. He infused a rare blend of artistic virtuosity and filmi glamour to his portrayal of romantic characters like Radha-Krishna, Nala-Damayanti, and Viswamitra-Menaka as also the many heroes and heroines of Hindi cinema. In addition to his critically acclaimed masterpieces he also illustrated many popular film posters, film magazines and various other publications in what can collectively be termed as calendar art. His works remain hugely popular even today. His mythological paintings and calendar art have been collected widely. He is also widely celebrated in the Indian calendar industry for his "realistic" depiction (albeit inspired by contemporary Indian cinema) of themes from Hindu mythology. In these paintings he emphasised the physical forms of the heroes, heroines, gods and goddesses in marked contrast to traditional and classical styles of Indian painting. In his paintings, Pandit depicted his subjects as handsome, muscular, valorous men and sensuously beautiful, voluptuous women set in surroundings suggestive of cinema settings and sceneries.

His art gallery is maintained by family members and is open for visitors from 10.30 to 17.30 at his residence in Kalaburagi, Karnataka

== Brief biography ==
Born on 25 March 1916, in Gulbarga district of Karnataka state, Pandit became a student of Shankar Rao Alandkar who was also a Sir. J. J. School of Arts product. Subsequently, he took his diploma from the Madras School of Art. He came to Mumbai in 1935 and joined Nootan Kala Mandir for further studies under the guidance of Shri G S Dandavathimath and appeared for his Diploma at Sir. J.J. School of Arts where he was taught by renowned teachers like Shri K.B Chudekar. His headmaster at the Sir J. J. School was the famous artist M. V. Dhurandhar known for his use of naturalistic techniques to depict scenes from Indian mythology, History and Classical Literature, a style he inherited from Raja Ravi Varma, and passed on to Pandit. Pandit was also greatly influenced by Capt. W. E. Gladstone Solomon, the then Director of Art in Sir J. J. School of Arts Mumbai. Pandit subsequently completed his Diploma with distinction.

== Career in art ==
As S. M. Pandit father's financial condition was very poor, his aunt sold her gold bangles which fetched her Rs 50 and gave money to Pandit to move Bombay for his further studies and career. This was a great turning point for him, Pandit soon made his mark in the commercial world of advertising, as also calendar and film art. He began his commercial career in 1938–39, by painting MGM showcards for Bombay's Metro Theater. He and a few other artists set up the Young Artists Commercial Arts Studio in Bombay, designing the publicity for Franz Osten's 1938 Bombay talkies film Bhabhi. They also became the first Indians to create painted show-cards featuring Hollywood greats, Greta Garbo, Norma Shearer, and Joan Crawford for the MGM.

During this period, Pandit also innovated the use of quicker drying Gouache on cloth over oil paints in creating his film posters. Pandit left the Studio to join Ratan Batra's advertising agency, which had as its clientele many of the new indigenous industrial houses like Mafatlal, Kohinoor, Khatau, etc. Pandit also met Baburao Patel, the editor of Filmindia magazine around this time and began designing and illustrating the cover pages for Filmindia which continue to be popular even to this day.

By 1944, Pandit set up his own studio called Studio S. M. Pandit in Bombay's Shivaji Park where he produced film publicity for Prabhat Studios, Raj Kapoor, Sohrab Modi, among many others. In the studio Pandit collaborated with another young artist from Goa, Raghuvir Mulgaonkar (1922–76) who continued to gratefully acknowledge the immense influence that Pandit had in developing his oeuvre. During this time, Pandit designed the posters and other publicity material for such films as Dr. Kotnis Ki Amar Kahani, 1946; Barsaat, 1949, etc. Pandit continued to work for Filmindia in his characteristic style typified by poster paintings with glamorous appeal, dramatic expression and bold graphic composition which influenced his other body of works including the religious and mythological paintings which continue to be his lasting legacy.

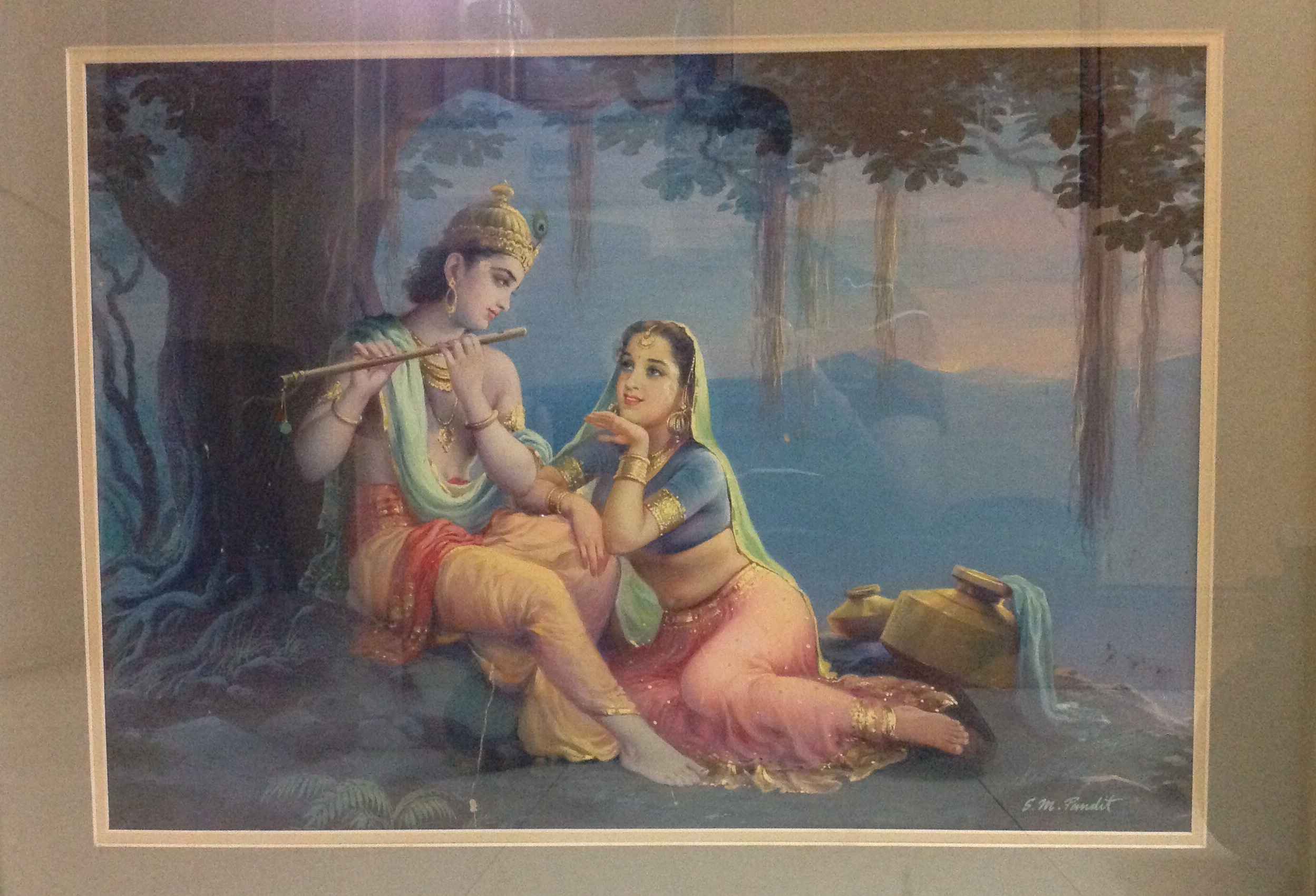
A poster painting by S M Pandit of Krishna fluting to a doe eyed Radha at the break of dawn.

Pandit had started painting mythological subjects in the 1950s on orders from the Bombay Fine Arts Press and Nagpur's Shivraj Fine Arts Press. While the influence of Raja Ravi Varma and M. V. Dhurandhar are more than evident in these paintings, it is also true that the 'Filmi' influence in the characterisation of 'made-up' protagonists with highlights shimmering on their hair and lips, muscular Tarzan-like gods and Disney-like detailing of flowers and animals is equally important.

In a certain sense, Pandit inherited the "naturalistic" or the " realistic" stye of painting from Raja Ravi Varma. However Pandit along with Mulgaonkar, took a further step by subjecting the new forms of religious and mythic imagery inaugurated by Raja Ravi Varma, to the technical innovations of his times in tune with the demands of the market, particularly in relation to film and calendar art. Further, the "realism" or "naturalism" of his paintings and posters particularly with reference to mythological and religious subjects should be seen in the context of his realistic departure from the canonical iconography traditionally prescribed for such subjects which was by and large followed in the classical and traditional styles of Indian painting. It is also in the same context, that we can explain a certain amount of stasis and continuity in the imagery of Gods and Goddesses, begun by Raja Ravi Varma and subsequently insisted upon by the rapidly expanding markets in the calendar and poster art of C. Kondiah Raju, the Nathdwara artists and further down with Pandit and other contemporary artists of the genre. Many of the Hindu religious images of the calendar art era have been subsequently adopted and innovated, wholly or in part by the present day Hindutva propaganda.

Among his other masterpieces is the life size portrait of Swami Vivekananda at Kanyakumari. Pandit has also painted several other portraits of prominent persons and leaders, including the portrait of Mahatma Gandhi now at the New Council Hall, Mumbai.

== Rewards and recognition ==
Needless to say, recognition and rewards came in ample measure to Pandit. In his own time, he was recognised as the foremost artist in the Genre by many of his contemporaries and continues to influence artists even to the present day. He was awarded a medal at the International exhibition in Toronto in 1944 for one of his cover designs. The exhibition of his mythological and portrait paintings in 1978 at the Ravi Shankar Hall and the Indian High Commission in London and Manchester won him popular appreciation and critical acclaim. He was also elected a Fellow of the Royal Society of Arts, London (F.R.S.A.)in 1978. During the Festival of India held in London, he painted portraits of Mrs. Indira Gandhi and Mrs. Margaret Thatcher, which are on permanent display in the Indian High Commission and Commonwealth Institute in London.

His paintings, posters and prints figure in many important collections including the Roman Art Gallery in New York, H. Daniel Smith Poster Archive in the Syracuse University library and many other private and public collections in India and abroad.

Pandit was the founder member of the Commercial Artists guild, Mumbai. He was a recipient of the Gold Medal of the Royal Academy in London and was also conferred the State Lalit Kala Academy Award in 1983, and the Rajyotsava Award in 1984. He was conferred the D.Litt. from Gulbarga University, Karnataka in 1986.

== Bibliography ==
- Panchal, Mohanrao B. Chitrakalavida Dr S M Pandit. – Prasaranga publications.
- Duncan, Paul; Bouman, Edo; Devraj, Rajesh.The Art of Bollywood. – Taschen Publications.
- Pinney, Christopher. Photos of the Gods: The Printed Image and Political Struggle in India.
- Kaur, Raminder; Sinha, Ajay J. Bollyworld: Popular Indian Cinema Through A Transnational Lens – Sage Publications India Pvt Ltd.
- Jain, Kajri. Gods in the Bazaar: The Economies of Indian Calendar Art – Duke University Press.
