= B. Sheikh Ali =

Indian historian (died 2022)

B. Sheikh Ali (died 1 September 2022) was an Indian historian. He received Bachelor's and Master's degrees from the University of Mysore, where he would later work as a member of the faculty. He received PhDs from the Aligarh Muslim University in 1954 and the University of London in 1960. He authored 55 books, 12 of which were in Urdu. He served at various points as the vice chancellor of Goa University and Mangalore University. An obituary in The New Indian Express described him as an authority on Hyder Ali and Tipu Sultan, and the history of the Kingdom of Mysore during the British Raj.
