= Flag Satyagraha =

Campaign during the Indian independence movement

The two Swaraj flags of Congress party were central to the nationalist struggle and the ideals of satyagraha

Flag Satyagraha (Marathi: झेंडा सत्याग्रह) was a campaign of peaceful civil disobedience in British-ruled India during the Indian independence movement that focused on exercising the right and freedom to hoist the nationalist flag and challenge the legitimacy of the British Rule in India through the defiance of laws prohibiting the hoisting of nationalist flags and restricting civil freedoms. Flag Satyagrahas were conducted most notably in the city of Jabalpur and Nagpur in 1923 but also in many other parts of India.

== Background ==
The hoisting of nationalist flags over private and public buildings (including sometimes government buildings) had been a common nationalist act of defiance, especially with the Revolutionary movement for Indian independence and the members of the revolutionary Gadar Party. Such acts of defiance gained currency across India with the rise of nationalist leaders such, Bipin Chandra Pal and Lala Lajpat Rai.

The Flag Satyagraha was a term coined to describe the hoisting of the flag as a defiance against British-imposed restrictions on civil freedom and also the legitimacy of British rule in India altogether. Proliferating during the Non-cooperation movement (1920-1922) and a prominent element of the Salt Satyagraha (1930) and the Quit India movement (1942), this means of revolt combined the hoisting of the nationalist flag with the technique of Satyagraha — non-violent civil disobedience — as pioneered by Mahatma Gandhi. Nationalists were encouraged to violate the law and hoist the flag without resisting arrest or retaliating against police.

== Revolts ==
Flag satyagrahas were one of the most common acts of defiance during the nationalist rebellions led by Gandhi and the Indian National Congress throughout the struggle. The nationalist flag was regularly heralded by large processions and nationalist crowds. On 31 December 1929 the Congress concluded the adoption of the Purna Swaraj declaration of independence with Congress President Jawaharlal Nehru hoisting the nationalist flag along the banks of the Ravi River. The flag was also hoisted at the commencement of the Quit India rebellion on 7 August 1942 at Gowalia Tank in Mumbai (then Bombay).

The flag satyagraha of Nagpur (which was initiated by Sardar Vallabhbhai Patel) and Jabalpur occurred over several months in 1923. The arrest of nationalist protestors demanding the right to hoist the flag caused an outcry across India especially as Gandhi had recently been arrested. Nationalist leaders such as Sardar Vallabhbhai Patel, Jamnalal Bajaj, Chakravarthi Rajagopalachari, Dr. Rajendra Prasad and Vinoba Bhave organised the revolt and thousands of people from different regions including as far south as the Princely state of Travancore traveled to Nagpur and other parts of the Central Provinces (now in Maharashtra and Madhya Pradesh) to participate in civil disobedience. In the end, the British negotiated an agreement with Patel and other Congress leaders permitting the protestors to conduct their march unhindered and obtaining the release of all those arrested.

Other notable flag satyagrahas were organised in Mysore (now in Karnataka) in 1938 known as Shivapur Dhwaja Satyagraha. Under leadership of T.Siddalingaih president of Mysore Congress. As a part of state-wide Satyagraha organised by Indian National Congress leaders, the flag was hoisted at Vidurashwatha in Kolar district of Mysore state, 33 people were killed and more than 100 injured in open police firing. This incidence happened on 25 April 1938 also called as Vidurashwatha massacre.

Several commemorations and reenactments of the rebellions have occurred as part of anniversary celebrations, the Independence Day (15 August) and Republic Day (26 January).
