= Chingkhu Telheiba =

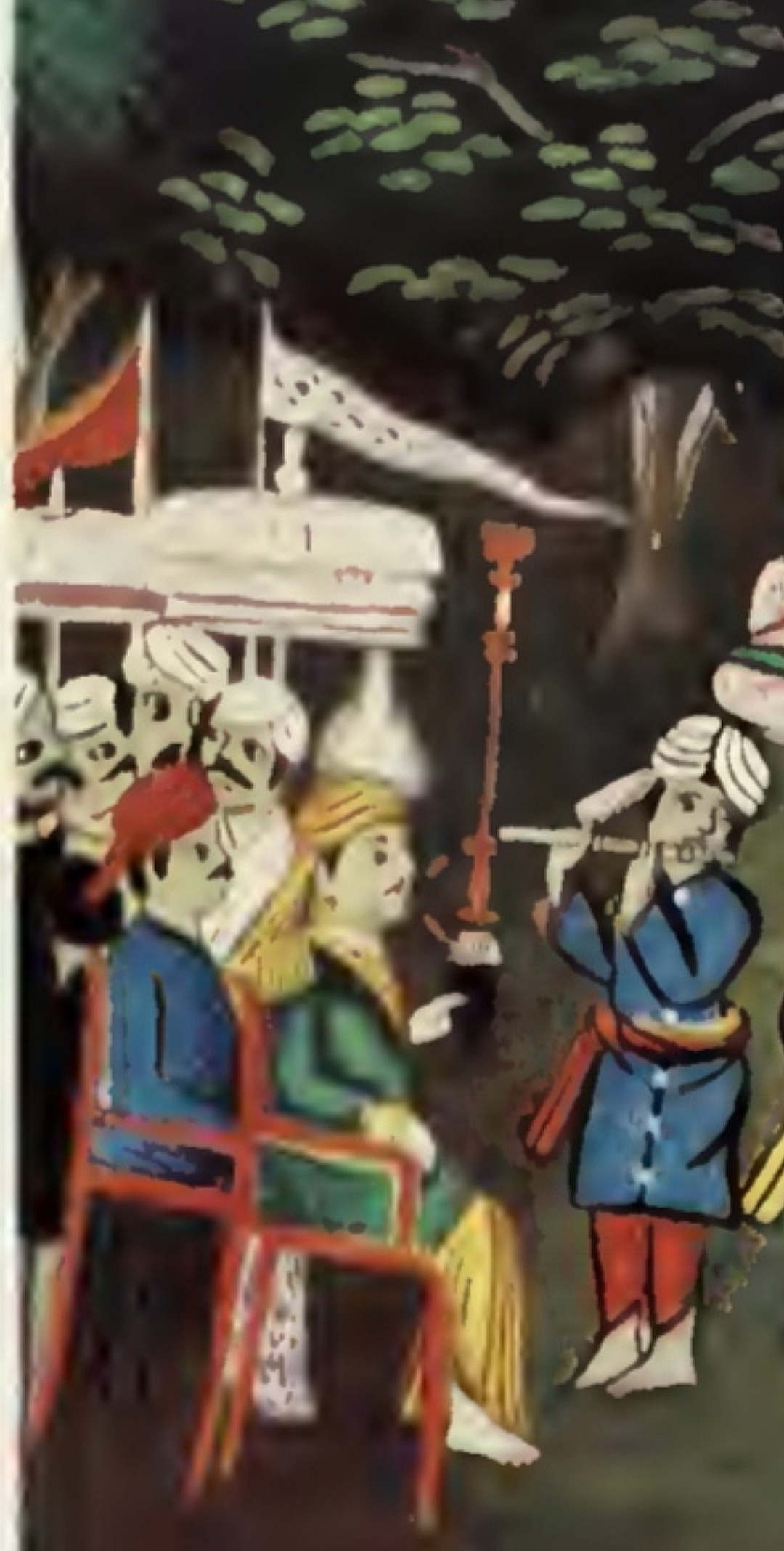
King Iwang Puriklai Chingkhu Telheiba & his younger brother, Chingkhu Akhuba, with their attendees

Iwang Puriklai Chingkhu Telheiba (ꯏꯋꯥꯡ ꯄꯨꯔꯤꯛꯂꯥꯏ ꯆꯤꯡꯈꯨ ꯇꯦꯜꯍꯩꯕꯥ), shortly known as Chingkhu Telheiba (ꯆꯤꯡꯈꯨ ꯇꯦꯜꯍꯩꯕ), was the king of the Moirang dynasty in the ancient Moirang kingdom. He ruled from 1083 CE to 1138 CE, during a time when his family and Moirang Kangla court were central to the stories of the classical epic Khamba Thoibi of the Moirang Kangleirol tradition of Meitei mythology and folklore. Having no sons, his younger brother Chingkhu Akhuba was made the crown prince (wangol ningthou, or wangon ningthou). Both brothers are sometimes called Chingkhuba, which can cause confusion.

== Family ==
King Chingkhu Telheiba had no sons, despite having multiple wives. One of his wives, Ngangkha Leima, became pregnant and before she gave birth to a daughter named Khamnu, the king gave Ngangkha Leima to Khuman Puremba, a warrior who had saved his life during the Torbung tiger hunting incident.

As a result, Khamnu, the king’s daughter, was born in Khuman Puremba’s house. Ngangkha Leima later gave birth to Khuman Khamba, the biological son of Khuman Puremba.

The king secretly showed affection for both his daughter Khamnu and her younger half-brother Khuman Khamba.

== Relationship with Khuman Puremba ==
King Chingkhu Telheiba rewarded Khuman Puremba for his bravery in collecting annual tributes from Kabui Salang Maiba, the tribal chief of the Salangthel Hills, a tributary region of the Moirang kingdom. The tribute collection had initially been resisted by the tribal rebels, but Khuman Puremba successfully subdued the rebellion.

After Khuman Puremba’s death and Khuman Khamba’s adulthood, the king gave Khamba the ministerial position of Leiroi Hanjaba, which had been held by Khuman Puremba. This was both a reward for service and a continuation of trust between the king and Khuman Khamba’s family.

== Protection and care for Thoibi ==
King Chingkhu Telheiba also cared for his younger brother Chingkhu Akhuba’s daughter, Princess Thoibi. He ordered that no man should go to Loktak Lake when Thoibi went there for fishing with her ladies-in-waiting, including Senu, and her friends, including Khamnu.

The king promised to marry Thoibi to her lover Khuman Khamba if Khamba successfully captured the feral Kao (bull) from the Ikop Pat lake shore, part of the Khuman kingdom. This decision was later challenged by Chingkhu Akhuba, who argued that a biological father had more rights over his daughter’s marriage than an uncle, even if the latter was the king. The king was upset by this but did not confront his younger brother.

== Justice and royal decisions ==
When Chingkhu Akhuba attempted to kill Khuman Khamba, who was badly injured, King Chingkhu Telheiba punished his own brother without bias. He jailed Chingkhu Akhuba until the victim fully recovered. Complaints had come from ministers Thonglen and Chaoba Nongthon, a man named Pheiroijamba, and Princess Thoibi.

Later, when there was a dispute over Thoibi’s marriage, between Khuman Khamba (supported by the king) and Angom Nongban Kongyamba (supported by Chingkhu Akhuba), the king decided that both suitors should try to kill or capture the tiger of Khoirentak region. Whoever succeeded would marry Princess Thoibi.

== See also ==
- List of rulers of Moirang
- Moirang Ningthourol Lambuba
