= Thonglen =

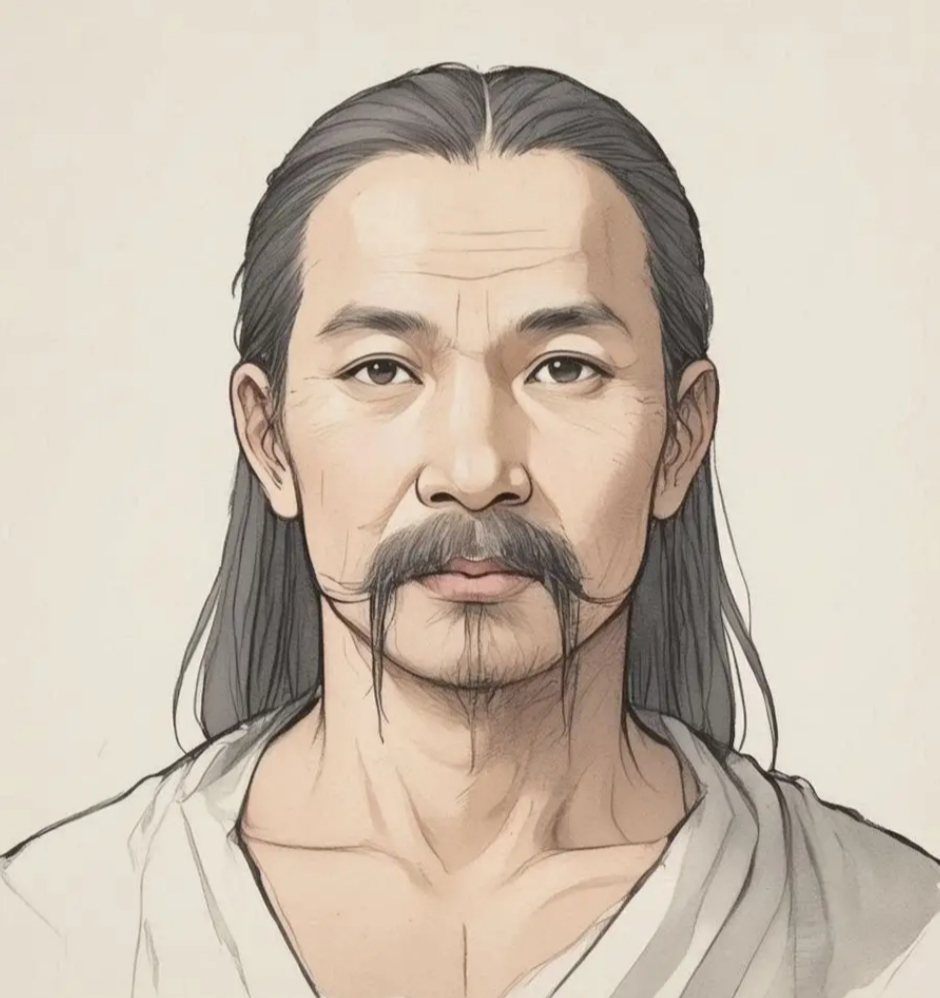
Minister Thonglen

Thonglen (ꯊꯣꯡꯂꯦꯟ), also spelled as Thonglel (ꯊꯣꯡꯂꯦꯜ), was a minister and court official in the Moirang kingdom, appearing prominently in the Moirang Kangleirol legends. He is depicted as a brave, short-tempered, and decisive figure, whose loyalty to friends and sense of duty often coexist with impulsive actions that lead to unintended consequences.

== Personality and character ==
Thonglen is described as short-tempered, fearless, hyper-masculine, and quick to act, often making decisions without much second thought. He is also pure-hearted, compassionate, and protective of the helpless, showing strong moral courage in helping those in need. Despite his impulsive nature, he frequently experiences remorse for unintended outcomes, showing a reflective aspect of his personality.

== Friendship ==
Thonglen was a close friend and peer of the warrior Puremba and Chaoba Nongthon in the Moirang court, Moirang Kangla. All three shared equality in official rank and mutual respect. However, Thonglen is also indirectly associated with Puremba's death. On the night of the birth of Puremba's son Khamba, Puremba struck the Moirang war drum at midnight in joy, a signal meant only for emergencies. Thonglen, angered by the disturbance, used his magical abilities at the Nunggoibi sacred site to capture five souls of the person who had beaten the national emergency drum. This act caused Puremba to fall gravely ill and die, despite efforts from Kabui Salang Maiba to heal him. Thonglen later expressed regret for his role in the incident, reflecting his remorseful and reflective nature.

== Care of Khamba and Khamnu ==
After Puremba's death, Thonglen took on responsibility for his orphaned children, Khamba and Khamnu, sharing duties with Chaoba Nongthon. Puremba had entrusted Thonglen with two large wooden chests containing treasures, luxurious clothes, ornaments, and weapons, intended for the children's future use. Thonglen safeguarded the chests carefully until they were needed.

Thonglen had many wives but no biological children. He strictly instructed them to care for Puremba's children, warning that any mistreatment would result in any of the disobedient wives being returned to their paternal house and forbidden from returning to his house. Fearing Thonglen, his wives ensured the orphans were treated well, though the children did not always remain in his household due to circumstances beyond control.

When the siblings secretly fled Moirang to Salangthel to escape harassment by Thangarakpa, Thonglen initially suspected that Chaoba Nongthon had hidden them. He stormed to Chaoba Nongthon's house, nearly leading to a physical confrontation. Chaoba Nongthon, calm and wise, clarified that he did not know their whereabouts. Together, the two men attempted to locate the children, but they were unable to find them because the siblings had secretly departed.

Some versions of the legend explain that God Thangjing transformed into a tiger, leaving footprints in the empty house of Puremba to create the impression that the children had been devoured. Believing this, Thonglen and Chaoba Nongthon eventually stopped searching, mourning the supposed loss and forgetting about the siblings for several years.

== Reunion with Khamba and Khamnu ==
Years later, Khamba, now an adult, returned to Moirang and gained fame by defeating the wrestling champion Nongban in a public arena. When questioned about his identity, Khamba initially hid it but later revealed it with the consent of his sister Khamnu. Thonglen and Chaoba Nongthon recognized the long-lost children of their late friend Puremba. From this point onwards, they continued to support Khamba and Khamnu, aiding them in the Moirang kingdom and assisting in their rise to prominence.

When Khamnu and Khamba required garments for a public gathering, they initially attempted to obtain them from Thangarakpa, who refused them. Following a dream visitation from Ngangkha Leima, the goddess and mother of the siblings, Khamnu was instructed that Thonglen held the chests. She and Khamba went to his house at midnight to retrieve them but were mistaken for thieves by Thonglen's security guards and briefly detained. Upon learning their identity and purpose, Thonglen recognized the children and returned the chests, fulfilling Puremba's dying wish.

== Legacy ==
Thonglen is remembered in Moirang Kangleirol stories as a complex character, courageous, loyal, impulsive, and remorse. He played an important role in both the tragic death of Puremba and the care and later reunion with Puremba's children, showing themes of human fallibility, duty, and redemption. His actions shows the challenges of responsibility in a feudal and supernatural context, balancing personal flaws with moral commitment to friends and the vulnerable.

== See also ==
- List of rulers of Moirang
