= Chaoba of Moirang =

Moirang Chaoba, or Chaoba or Chauba (meaning, "big" or "great", in Meitei language), mentioned in the Moirang Kangleirol tradition of Meitei mythology and folklore of ancient Moirang, may refer to:

- Chaoba Nongthon, an ancient Moirang minister
- Mungyang Chaoba, an ancient Moirang gardener
