= Ngangkha Lawai =

Ngangkha Lawai (ꯉꯥꯡꯈꯥ ꯂꯋꯥꯏ), also spelled Ngangkhalawai (ꯉꯥꯡꯈꯂꯋꯥꯏ) or Ngangkharawai (ꯉꯥꯡꯈꯔꯋꯥꯏ), is a village in the Moirang Sub Division of Bishnupur district, Manipur, India. Ngangkha Lawai is known in Moirang Kangleirol genre of Meitei mythology and folklore as the place where the goddess Arai Leima, also called Ngangkha Leima, first appeared to the hero Khuman Puremba (the rebirth of Mungyang Chaoba).

== Demographics ==
As of the 2011 census, Ngangkha Lawai has a total of 685 families residing in the area.

== Education ==
The village is served by Ngangkhalawai Upper Primary School, a government-run educational institution.

== Notable sites ==
- Khamba Thoibi Museum – A cultural site showing the history and legends of the Moirang kingdom, including the classical Meitei epic Khamba Thoibi.

== Culture ==
In Moirang Kangleirol genre of Meitei mythology and folklore, the goddess Arai Leima (ꯑꯔꯥꯏ ꯂꯩꯃ), later renamed as Ngangkha Leima (ꯉꯥꯡꯈ ꯂꯩꯃ), emerged from the bushes in the remote area of Ngangkha Lawai to request Puremba to take her as his wife. She was later called Ngangkha Leima by Chingkhu Telheiba, the king of Moirang, who did not know her divine identity. The site is therefore associated with the origins of the events leading to the epic of Khamba and Thoibi, a classical romantic legend of the ancient Moirang kingdom. This connection makes Ngangkha Lawai an important cultural and mythological landmark in Manipur.

== See also ==
- Loktak lake
- Khuman kingdom
- Torbung hunting (Khamba Thoibi)
- Khoirentak tiger
