= Haoba Athouba =

Haoba Athouba was a Khuman warrior mentioned in the classical Meitei literary work Chainarol (An Account of Combats). He was involved in a duel fight with Wangkhei Khoiya, a warrior from the Mangang/Ningthouja Meitei community. Later, he died in the hands of his opponent, through decapitation.

== Background ==
Haoba Athouba was a member of the Khuman clan, the principal community of Khuman kingdom. During his time, the Khuman people were known for their military might and frequent engagements in ritual one on one fighting with warriors from other clans, particularly the Meitei (Ningthouja) (alias Mangang).

== Duel with Wangkhei Khoiya ==
In accordance with the Chainarol text, Haoba Athouba fought with Wangkhei Khoiya, a warrior from the Mangang/Ningthouja Meitei community. The duel fight occurred at an unnamed location. The purpose of the fight involved traditional, personal challenges, mutual respect before combat, and mortal consequences.

Haoba Athouba was badly injured in his neck during the fight and, was unable to continue the duet. He fled the battlefield, crying out for help from other men of the Khuman community, who were nearby, possibly fishing at the time. His withdrawal from the fight, however, did not prevent his opponent from chasing after him and ultimately defeating him.

Khoiya beheaded Haoba Athouba, which was a traditional standard ritual conclusion to such duels. His enemy returned home with his chopped off head displayed on a pole.

== See also ==
- Khuman warrior traditions
- Meitei martial arts
- Meitei traditional weapons
- Khuman kingdom
- Moirang kingdom
- Khuman dynasty
- Khuman Apokpa
- List of Khuman kings
- List of Khuman queens
- Khuman royal necklace incident
- Khuman Kangleirol
- Moirang Kangleirol
- Khuman Puremba
- Khuman Khamba
- Khumanlol
- Khuman language
- Khuman Kwakpa Litonpanba
- Maithingkongaba
- Thongbu Wainucha
- Chakha Moiremba
- Haokhong Sinaikhu
- Kangchin
