= Chaoba Nongthon =

Official nobleman of ancient Moirang Kingdom

Chaoba Nongthon (ꯆꯥꯎꯕ ꯅꯣꯡꯊꯣꯟ), also known as Chaoba Nongthol (ꯆꯥꯎꯕꯥ ꯅꯣꯡꯊꯣꯜ), was an official nobleman in the ancient Moirang kingdom, as described in the Moirang Kangleirol legends. He is known for his calm, wise, and strategic nature, and for his pivotal role in safeguarding the orphaned children of the warrior Puremba, namely Khamba and Khamnu, while also serving the kingdom in administrative and protective capacities.

== Personality and character ==
Chaoba Nongthon was known for his level-headedness, intelligence, and patience, standing in contrast to his contemporary Thonglen, who was impulsive, hot-tempered, and hyper-masculine. Chaoba Nongthon's thoughtful approach and wisdom made him a respected advisor and a stabilizing presence in the court of Moirang Kangla. He acted decisively to protect the vulnerable, particularly Puremba's children, and often mitigated Thonglen's rash actions.

== Family ==
Chaoba Nongthon was childless but had an adoptive son Pheiroijamba (also spelled Feiroijamba). He and Puremba agreed that Pheiroijamba and Puremba's daughter, Khamnu, would be fiance and fiancee from childhood, establishing a lifelong bond between the families. Chaoba Nongthon later became the father-in-law of Khamnu when the marriage was fulfilled.

== Contribution to national silk imports ==
Chaoba Nongthon played an important role in the import of silk (Kabo lang, or kabrang in Meitei language) to the Moirang kingdom, a luxury not locally produced. The silk was sourced from Kabaw (Kabo) region (modern-day western Myanmar), the then tributary region of Moirang kingdom. Through his intelligence, diplomacy, and strategic oversight, Chaoba Nongthon ensured the annual tribute of silk reached Moirang royalty and nobility, enabling the kingdom's elite to maintain their cultural and economic standards. His skills were officially acknowledged by the Moirang king, highlighting his importance beyond military or protective roles.

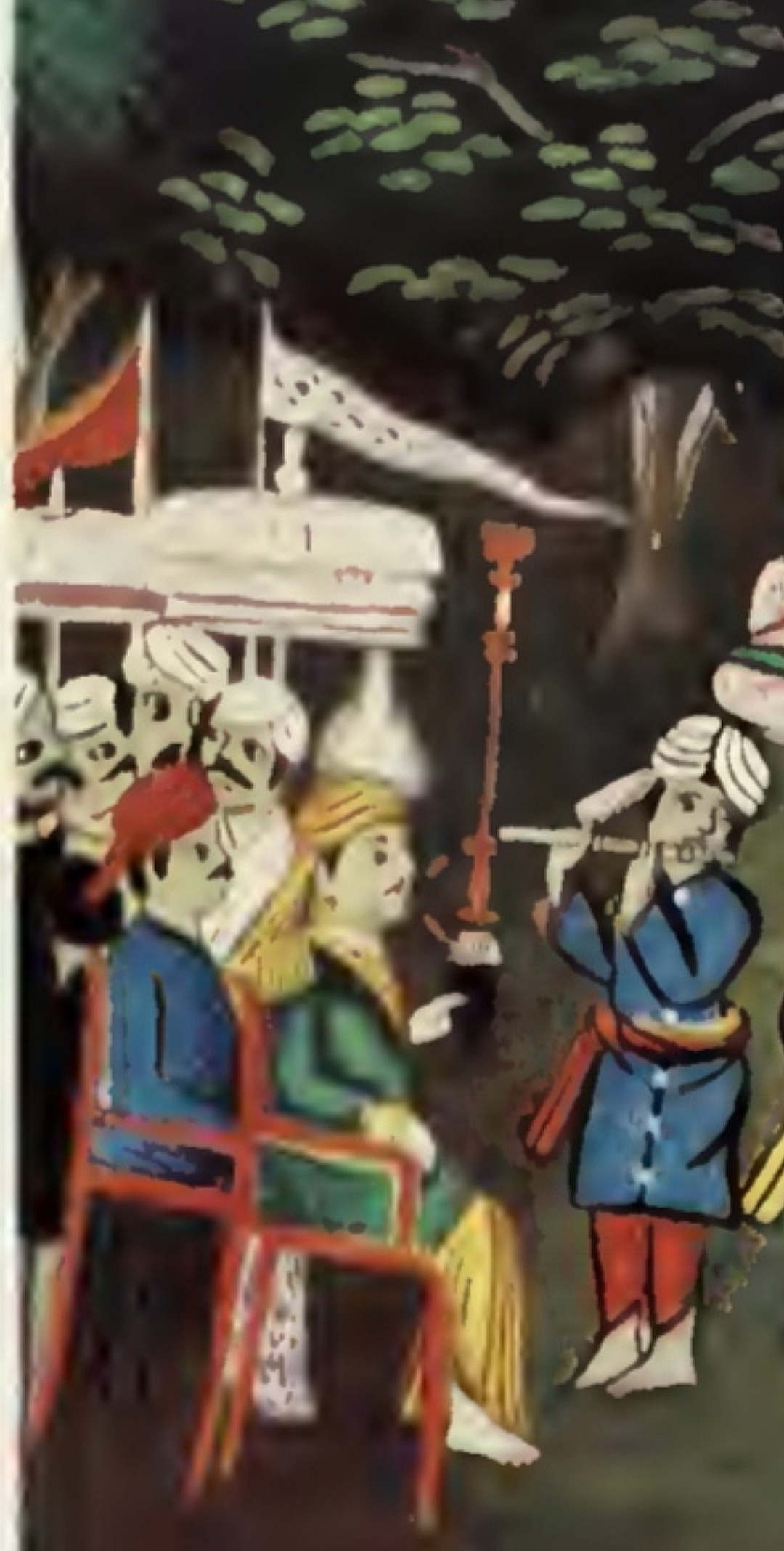
The silk luxurious clothes worn by the ancient Moirang royalties and nobles were credited to the contributions of Minister Chaoba Nongthon at his times.

== Guardianship ==
Chaoba Nongthon's prominence in Moirang is closely tied to his association with the warrior Puremba. After Puremba's death, Chaoba Nongthon, along with Thonglen, was entrusted with the care of Puremba's orphaned children. Chaoba Nongthon oversaw their upbringing and welfare, ensuring their safety in accordance with Puremba's wishes.

He adopted a calm and protective approach, guiding Khamba and Khamnu while navigating political and social challenges, including the hostility of certain Moirang officials who harbored enmity toward Puremba.

=== Children's care and mysterious missing ===
During the children's early years, Chaoba Nongthon and Thonglen took turns caring for Khamba and Khamnu. The siblings had secretly fled to Salangthel for safety, because of threats from Thangarakpa. Thonglen, impulsive and suspicious, suspected Chaoba Nongthon of hiding the children when they mysteriously disappeared and stormed his house in anger. Chaoba Nongthon patiently explained that he did not know the children's whereabouts. Together, they searched, but did not find them.

In some accounts, God Thangjing transformed into a tiger and left footprints in Puremba's empty house, creating the impression that the children had been devoured. Shocked and saddened, Chaoba Nongthon and Thonglen eventually ceased searching, believing the siblings lost.

=== Reunion with Khamba and Khamnu ===
Years later, after Khamba reached adulthood, he defeated Nongban, the national wrestling champion of Moirang in public. Initially, Khamba hid his identity, and only after receiving permission from Khamnu did he reveal who he was. It was at this point that Chaoba Nongthon and Thonglen recognized the long-lost children of Puremba. This reunion restored their guardianship roles, allowing them to continue protecting Khamba and Khamnu into adulthood.

=== Protection and assistance in the siblings' adulthood ===
Following their reunion, Chaoba Nongthon continued to protect and support Khamba and Khamnu:

- When Khamba faced an assassination conspiracy orchestrated by Crown Prince Chingkhu Akhuba, who tied him to a royal elephant, Chaoba Nongthon intervened and petitioned King Chingkhu Telheiba, temporarily arresting Akhuba to ensure Khamba's survival.
- He provided security against former champion, Nongban and other threats to the siblings.

== See also ==
- List of rulers of Moirang
