= Pheiroijamba =

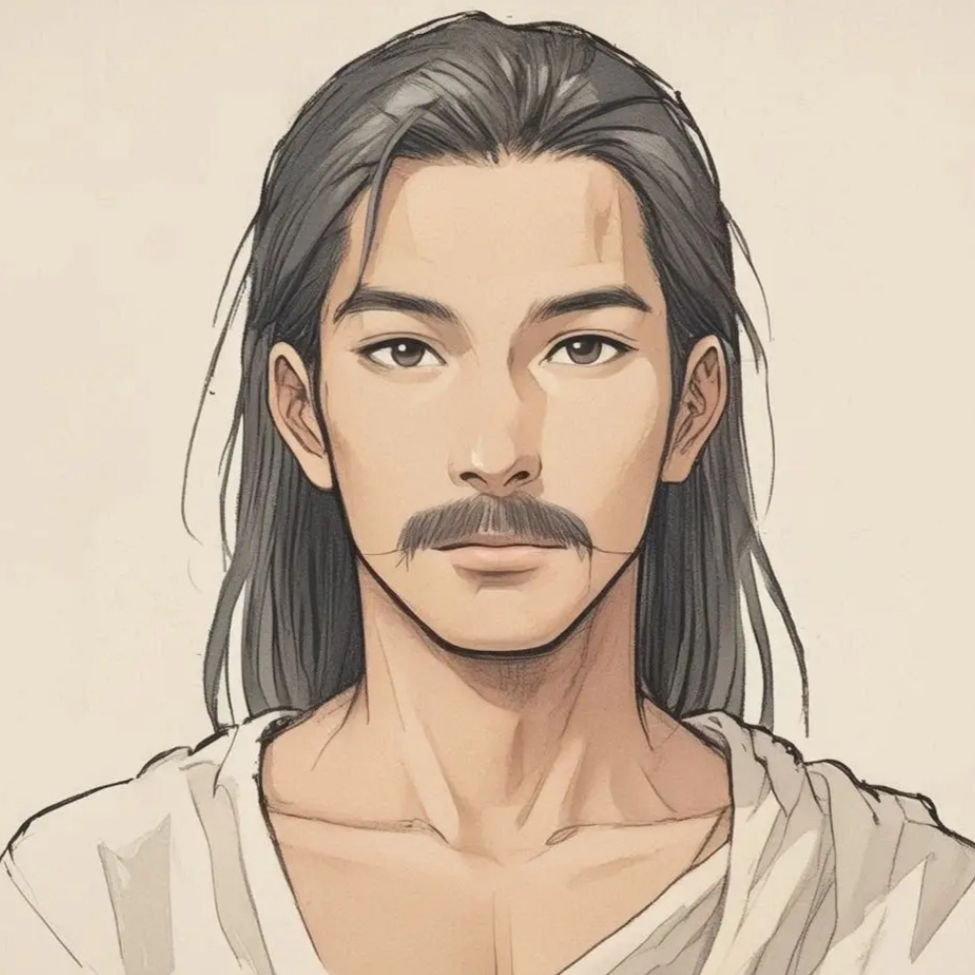
Pheiroijamba, the son of Chaoba Nongthon

Pheiroijamba (ꯐꯩꯔꯣꯏꯖꯥꯝꯕ, also spelled Feiroijamba) is a figure from the traditional Moirang Kangleirol stories of the ancient Moirang kingdom. He is the son of Chaoba Nongthon, a Moirang official and guardian of the orphaned children of the warrior Puremba. Pheiroijamba is the husband of Khamnu, the elder sister of Khamba, making him brother-in-law of Khamba and son-in-law of Puremba and Ngangkha Leima.

Pheiroijamba was a son-in-law of King Chingkhu Telheiba of Moirang, as his wife Khamnu was biologically the king's daughter but was raised by Puremba, just like her younger brother Khamba, who also became a son-in-law of the Moirang royal family by marrying Princess Thoibi, the daughter of the king's younger brother, Chingkhu Akhuba.

== Early life and adoption ==
Pheiroijamba was brought by Chaoba Nongthon to his household and raised as his son. Being childless, Chaoba Nongthon personally cared for Pheiroijamba, ensuring his proper upbringing and training. He was raised alongside Khamnu and her younger brother Khamba, the children of Puremba and Ngangkha Leima, who had been orphaned after Puremba's death and Ngangkha Leima's return to heaven.

== Marriage and family ==
In accordance with prior arrangements made between Chaoba Nongthon and Puremba, Pheiroijamba married Khamnu when they reached adulthood. Through this marriage, he became directly connected to the lineage of Puremba and Ngangkha Leima, reinforcing the protection and continuity of the family. As Khamnu's husband, he was closely involved in the lives of her family, including Khamba, his brother-in-law.

== Assistance to Khamba ==
Pheiroijamba always supported Khamba throughout his youth and adulthood. He discovered that Khamba was nearly killed during an assassination attempt by Chingkhu Akhuba, the younger brother of King Chingkhu Telheiba. Pheiroijamba immediately informed others and, together with his father Chaoba Nongthon, formally complained to King Chingkhu Telheiba about the incident, ensuring that justice was delivered without bias.

He also helped Khamba in the national racing championship, where Khamba faced attempts to be cheated by his rival, Angom Nongban Kongyamba. Pheiroijamba intervened and helped ensure fairness during the competition. Beyond these specific incidents, Pheiroijamba consistently supported Khamba whenever he faced danger, threats, or injustice.

== Legacy ==
Pheiroijamba is remembered in the Moirang Kangleirol stories as a devoted son, husband, and brother-in-law, whose loyalty to his family and protective actions were important to the survival and success of Khamba and Khamnu.

== See also ==
- Pheiroijam
