= Chaoba =

Chaoba or Chauba (meaning, "big" or "great", in Meitei language) may refer to:

- Khwairakpam Chaoba, an Indian author
- Thounaojam Chaoba Singh, an Indian politician
- Chaoba Devi Langam, an Indian footballer
- Chaoba Nongthon, an ancient Moirang minister
- Chaoba Devi Oinam, an Indian sepak takraw player
- Mungyang Chaoba, an ancient Moirang gardener

== See also ==
- Khana Chaoba (disambiguation), a title meaning "great in South" or "Southern Lord", used by two deities
