= Loi Kaaba =

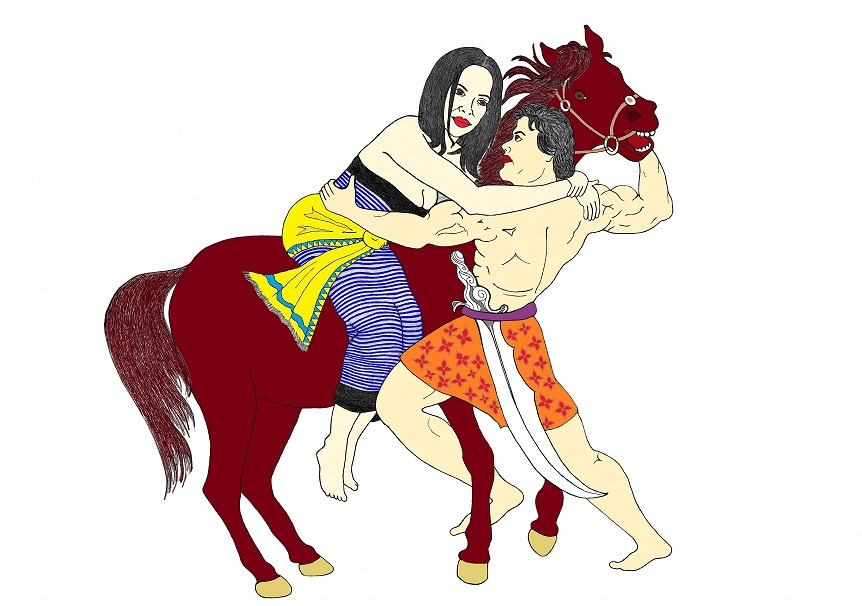
Thoibi Loi Kaba

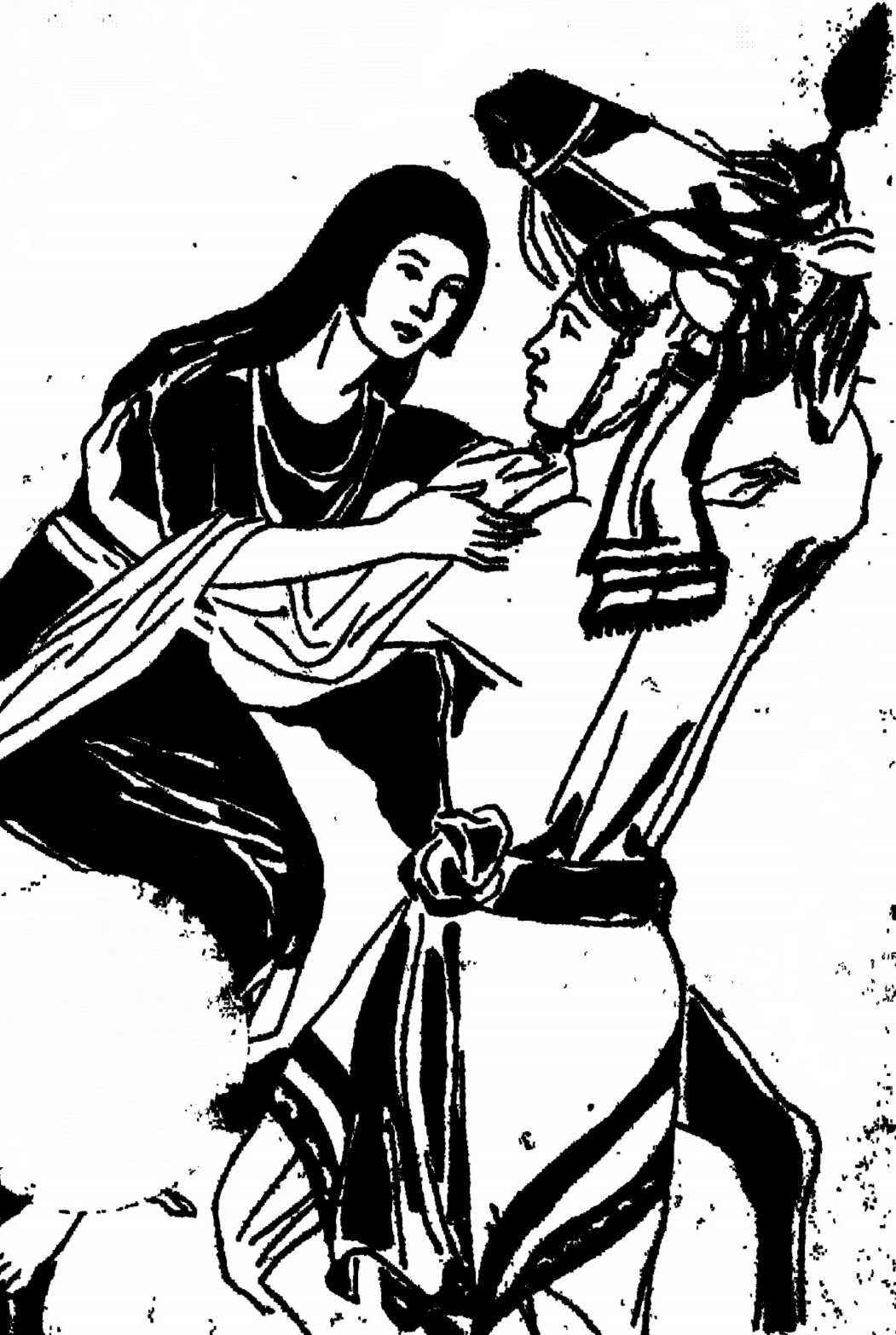
Ewanglon Thoibi Loi Kaaba

Loi Kaaba (ꯂꯣꯏ ꯀꯥꯕ), also known as Thoibi Loi Kaaba (ꯊꯣꯏꯕꯤ ꯂꯣꯏ ꯀꯥꯕꯥ), is an event from the Khamba Thoibi classical epic in the Moirang Kangleirol genre of Meitei mythology and folklore. It describes Princess Thoibi’s return from exile in the Kabaw (Kabo) region and the events that followed during her journey back to the Moirang kingdom.

== Background ==
After Thoibi's exile to Kabaw, God Thangjing softened the heart of her father, Crown Prince Chingkhu Akhuba. The prince sent men to bring his daughter back from Kabaw. At the same time, he secretly instructed Angom Nongban Kongyamba to forcibly elope Thoibi during her return journey.

Before leaving Kabaw, Thoibi prayed to the patron deity of the Kabaw chiefdom and thanked Kabaw Chief Tamurakpa for his hospitality. On her journey, she visited the stone on which she had earlier marked a token of her chastity. She prayed there and offered gold and silver. She also saw the staff given to her by her lover Khamba, which she had planted by the roadside. It had blossomed into a leafy tree.

== Encounter with Nongban ==
As Thoibi continued her journey, Angom Nongban Kongyamba and his men noticed her approaching. They announced her arrival. Hearing this, Thoibi instructed her companions to stay close if the man was Khamba, but to keep distance if it was Kongyamba. It was Kongyamba who approached her.

Thoibi pretended to be friendly and sat on Kongyamba's red carpet. However, she placed a stick between them to maintain distance. She asked him for fruits, which he provided, but she did not eat them. She then pretended to fall ill from the long journey from Kabaw.

== Escape and reunion ==
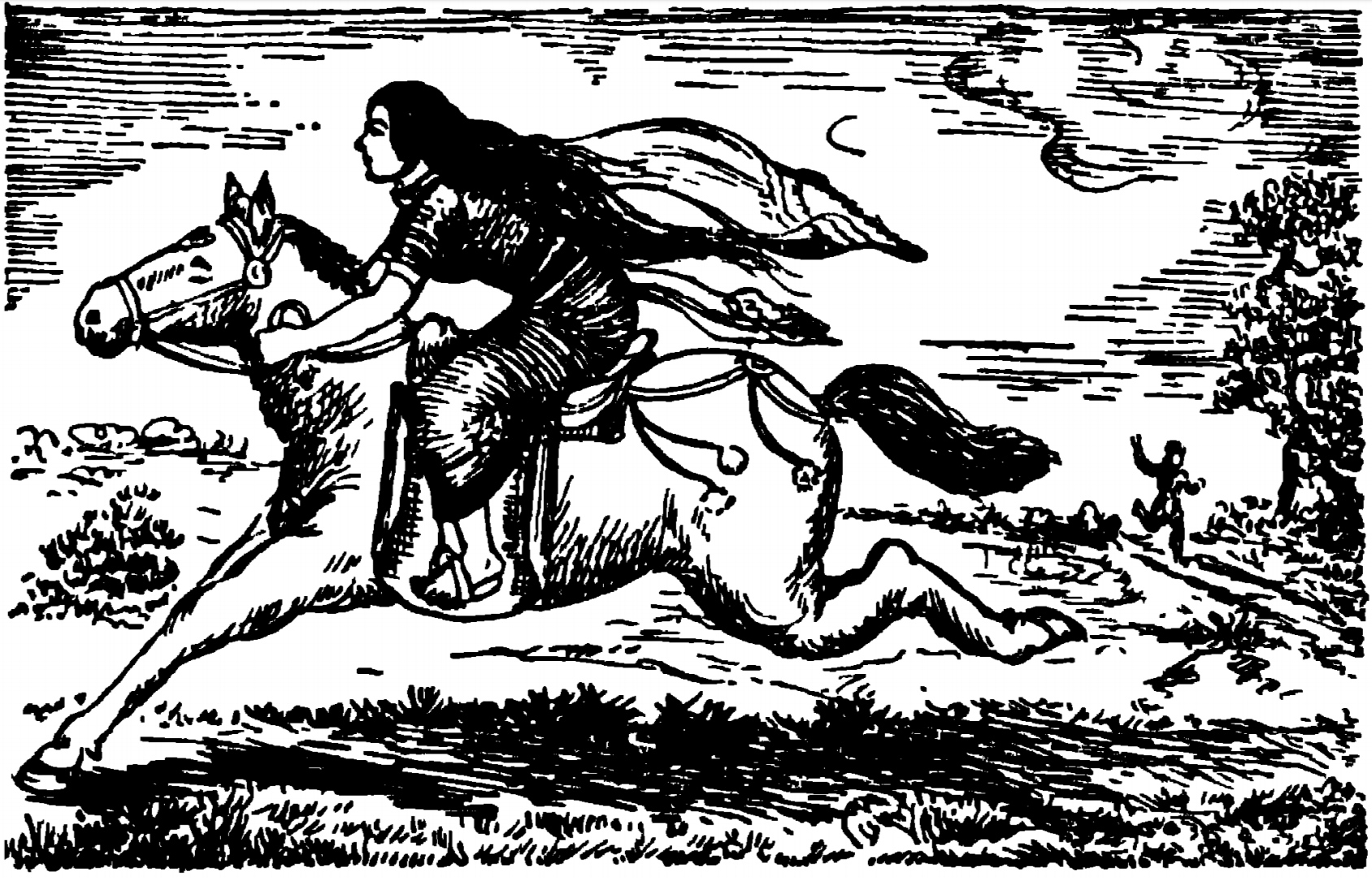
Princess Thoibi tricked Kongyamba and escaped from him.

Feigning weakness, Thoibi asked Kongyamba to let her ride his horse. He agreed, and she mounted the horse while Kongyamba rode in her palanquin. Suddenly, Thoibi galloped away toward Khamba's house. He chased her but could not reach her.

Khamba received Thoibi at his home after her long exile. Both wept in joy at their reunion.

== Aftermath ==
Kongyamba became furious after realizing he had been deceived. He sought support from the king's ministers to interfere in the matter. In support of Khamba, Minister Thonglen and Minister Chaoba Nongthonba sent guards to protect Khamba and Thoibi.

The issue was brought before King Chingkhu Telheiba in the Royal Court, Moirang Kangla. It was decided that the matter would be settled by marrying Thoibi to the man who could capture the tiger of Khoirentak.

== Gallery ==
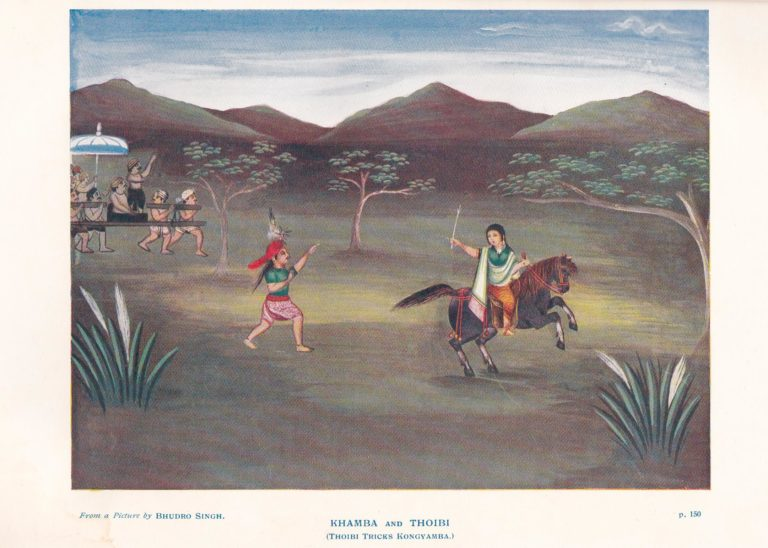

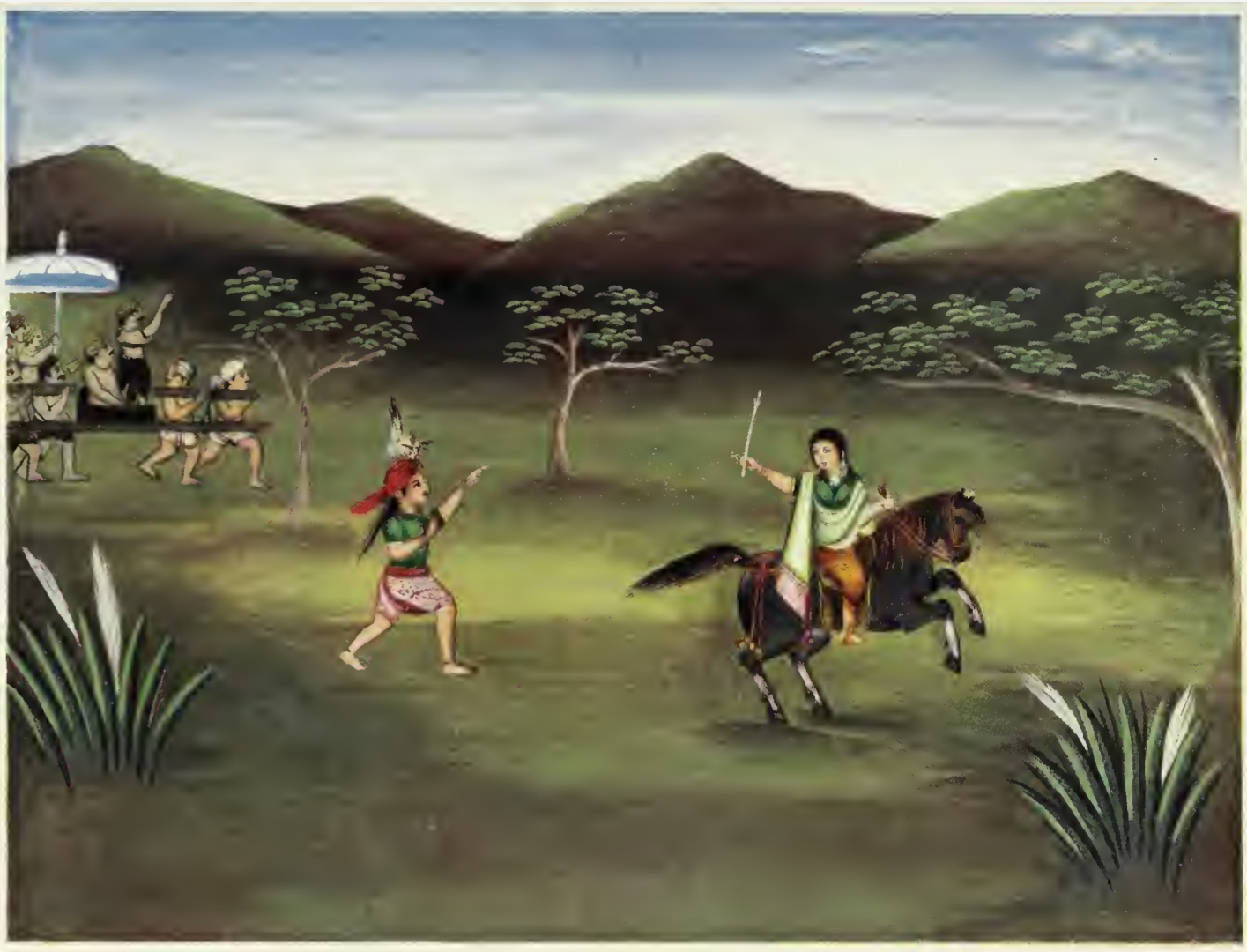

== See also ==
- List of Meitei princesses
