= Khuman Puremba =

Official of the Ancient Moirang kingdom

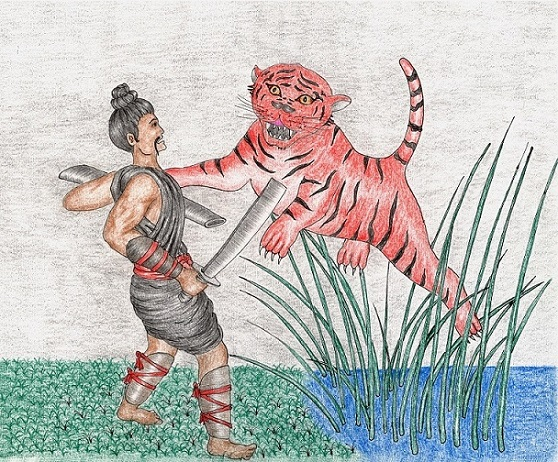
Puremba fighting with a tiger at Torbung

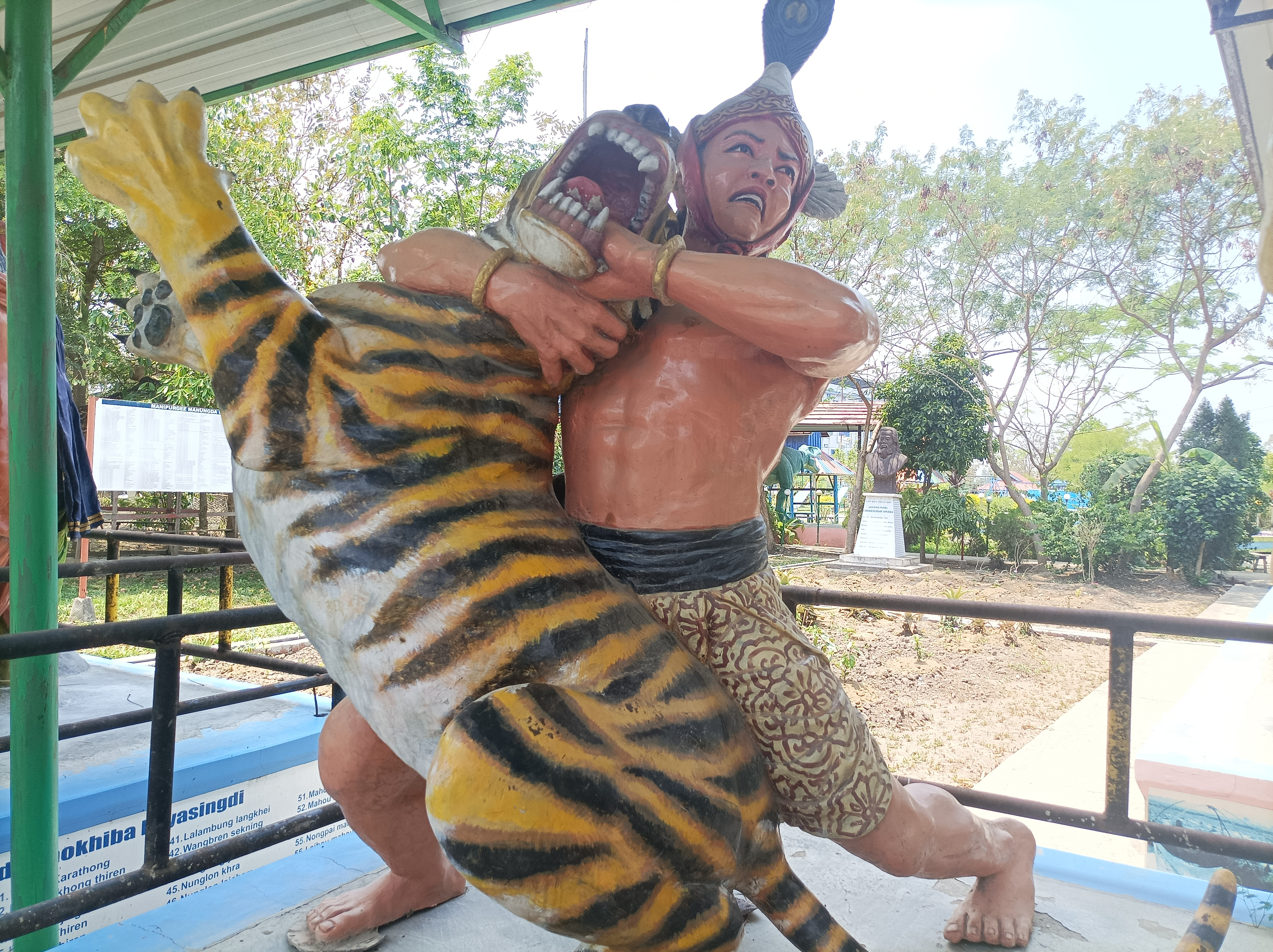
A modern depiction of the Torbung hunting incident, in which Puremba captured tigers

Khuman Puremba (ꯈꯨꯃꯟ ꯄꯨꯔꯦꯝꯕ), also known as Khuman Purenba (ꯈꯨꯃꯟ ꯄꯨꯔꯦꯟꯕ), was a warrior, royal official, and minister of the Ancient Moirang kingdom. He was known for his bravery, strength, and important role in both political and mythical traditions of Moirang society. Born in the ancestral Khuman royal bloodline, originated from the Khuman kingdom, but serving as a minister of the Moirang kingdom, Khuman Puremba fathered Khuman Khamba, the protagonist of the Khamba Thoibi classical Meitei epic, whose stylised poetic version, the Khamba Thoibi Sheireng, became the national epic of the Manipuris.

Khuman Puremba began his service in Moirang Kangla, the royal court of the Moirang kingdom as Leiroi Hanjaba, the royal official in charge of flowers. Through the favor of King Chingkhu Telheiba, he later received higher positions. After his death, when his son Khuman Khamba came of age, the king appointed him to the same post in honor of late Puremba, following the advice of Chaoba Nongthon.

== Ancestry and family ==
Khuman Puremba belonged to the Khuman dynasty of the Khuman kingdom. His ancestry is traced as follows:

- Son of Parenkoiba
  - Grandson of Haoramyaima, a Khuman prince
    - Haoramyaima was one of the three sons of Khuman King Yoithongai
      - Haoramyaima left the Khuman kingdom and settled in the Moirang kingdom due to the Khuman royal necklace incident.

Khuman Puremba married Ngangkha Leima. He had two children, Khamnu, a daughter who was biologically the daughter of Moirang King Chingkhu Telheiba, and Khuman Khamba, his biological son.

== Rebirth belief and mythological origin ==
In Moirang Kangleirol tradition of Meitei mythology and folklore, Khuman Puremba is believed to be the rebirth of Mungyang Chaoba, a gardener. Mungyang Chaoba did cohabitation with the celestial-origin goddess Arai Leima under a condition that they would stay together in the earthly realm until his natural death.

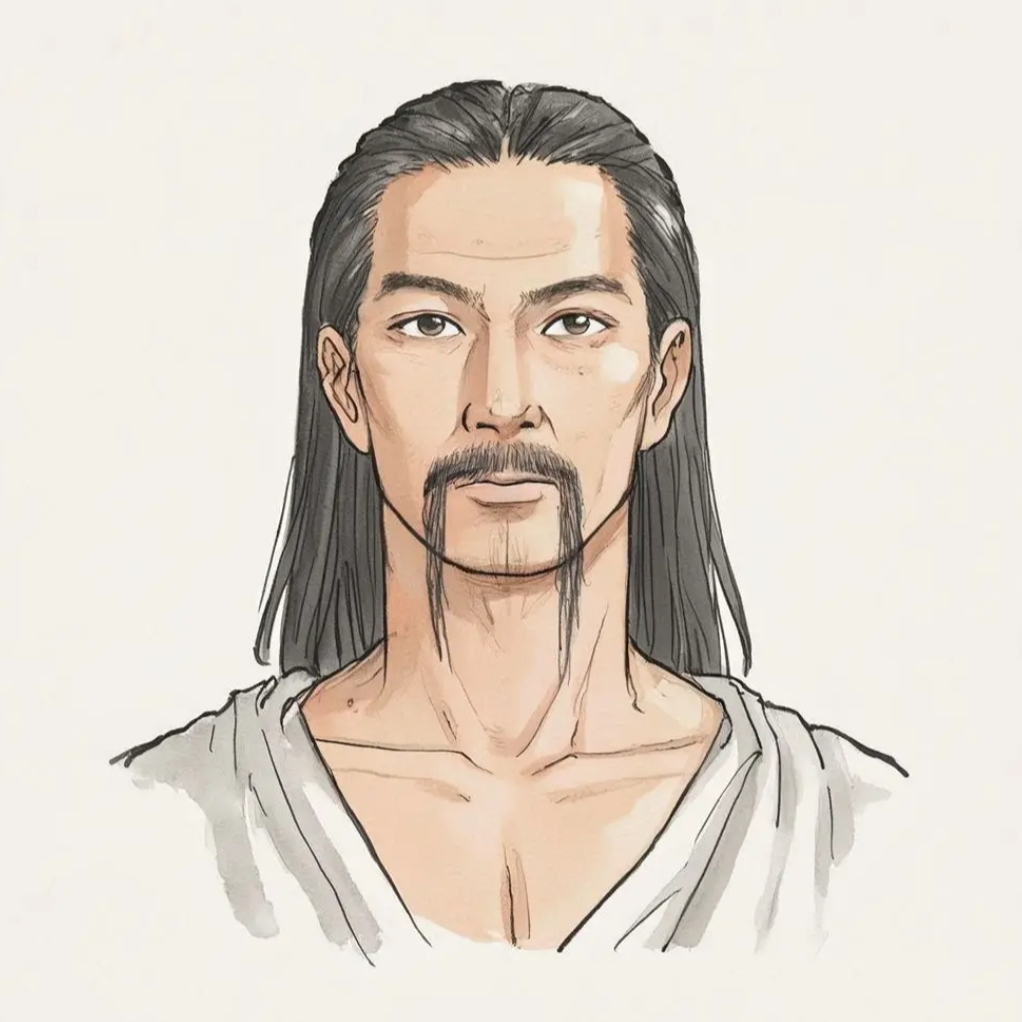
Mungyang Chaoba, the gardener who was believed to be the previous birth of Khuman Puremba

Mungyang Chaoba broke this condition by fleeing from the goddess. As a result, he died immediately, caused by God Thangching (also known as Thangjing), the national tutelary deity of Moirang kingdom. Thangjing then caused him to be reborn as Khuman Puremba so that he could meet Arai Leima again and fulfill the uncompleted condition.

Arai Leima later took the name Ngangkha Leima and became the wife of Khuman Puremba, the rebirth of Mungyang Chaoba.

== Military expedition to Salangthel ==
Khuman Puremba was known for his courage and physical strength. The Salangthel hill region, inhabited by the Kabui people, was ruled by the tribal chief Kabui Salang Maiba. Salangthel was a tributary region of the Moirang kingdom and was required to send annual tribute.

When Kabui Salang Maiba failed to send the tribute, it was considered a rebellion. Moirang King Chingkhu Telheiba sent Khuman Puremba to suppress it and bring the due annual tributes.

During the expedition, Khuman Puremba lifted and threw a massive rock that could not be moved by several men together. Witnessing this, the Kabui warriors fled and reported to their chief. To avoid bloodshed, Kabui Salang Maiba chose friendship with Khuman Puremba.

=== Deeds in Salangthel ===
Khuman Puremba performed several acts that strengthened his bond with Kabui Salang Maiba. He captured a wild and dangerous Kao (bull) that was destroying crops, saving the people from hardship. He helped Kabui Salang Maiba win a bride by defeating her father in a duel and then giving the bride to him. Because of these actions, Kabui Salang Maiba formed a strong friendship and brotherhood with Khuman Puremba.

Khuman Puremba returned to Moirang with the annual tribute for the Moirang king, the wild bull as his personal animal, as well as personal gifts from Kabui Salang Maiba.

== Meeting with future wife ==
On the return journey from Salangthel to Moirang, at the Ngangkha Lawai region, a woman of unknown origin, believed to be goddess Arai Leima in human disguise, appeared out of the bushes. In Moirang Kangleirol tradition of Meitei mythology and folklore, she had waited for him on earth since the time of Mungyang Chaoba (Puremba's previous birth) to reunite with him. She asked Khuman Puremba to take her as his wife. He brought her to Moirang on horseback.

Before going home, Khuman Puremba went to the Moirang Kangla to report to King Chingkhu Telheiba about his victory in the Salangthel military expedition, and also to submit the annual tributes collected from the region. He left the woman at the palace gate to wait until he came out.

=== Entry into the Royal Palace ===
Getting late, the woman could not wait further, and entered the palace to look for Puremba. King Chingkhu Telheiba saw her and was immediately attracted to her beauty. He requested Khuman Puremba to give her to the royal harem. Khuman Puremba could not refuse the king's order.

The king named her Ngangkha Leima, after Ngangkha Lawai, the place where she was found. She became pregnant with the king's child.

=== Intervention of God Thangjing ===
In Moirang Kangleirol tradition of Meitei mythology and folklore, God Thangjing intervened because Arai Leima was meant to stay on earth only with Khuman Puremba until his death.

Thangjing ordered nine minor gods to turn into tigers and disturb the Moirang kingdom. They were instructed to die only at the hands of Khuman Puremba.

== Nine tigers event ==
The nine tigers caused great destruction in Moirang kingdom. King Chingkhu Telheiba organized a royal hunt using a tall bamboo stage platform for safety to view warriors and hunters capturing the tigers at Torbung region.

During the hunt, all warriors fled except Khuman Puremba. Puremba captured three tigers and was rewarded. Three more tigers attacked the king, and Khuman Puremba killed them. He was rewarded again. The last three tigers attacked the king, and he subdued them. As the king had no further rewards, he gave Khuman Puremba his favorite concubine, Ngangkha Leima, who was already pregnant.

== Marriage and children ==
With King Chingkhu Telheiba's permission, the already pregnant Ngangkha Leima was married to Khuman Puremba. At Puremba's house, she gave birth to Khamnu, the king's biological daughter. Some years later, she gave birth to Khuman Khamba, Puremba's biological son, at midnight.

=== Midnight drum incident ===
Overcome with happiness, Khuman Puremba mistakenly beat the national battle warning drum at the Moirang Kangla. This drum was meant only for national security or emergencies in sudden enemy attacks. The act caused alarm throughout the kingdom. Soldiers and officials gathered but found no danger.

== Curse and death ==
Minister Thonglen, a friend of Khuman Puremba, used dark magic at the sacred Nunggoibi site at the Moirang Kangla, to pull out the soul of the unknown offender.

The next day, Khuman Puremba admitted his mistake publicly. He was not punished due to his status, but Thonglen later realized that the magic had affected his close friend. Khuman Puremba weakened day by day. Kabui Salang Maiba attempted to restore his soul using his own magic, but failed. He advised Puremba to apologize to Thonglen for the sake of his children. Khuman Puremba refused, stating that although his act was wrong, it did not deserve an apology. He accepted death as natural.

Prior to his death, Khuman Puremba entered into an agreement with his close friend, Chaoba Nongthon, stipulating that Puremba’s young daughter, Khamnu, would marry Chaoba Nongthon’s son, Pheiroijamba, once both children reached adulthood. Several years after Puremba’s death, when Khamnu and Pheiroijamba had grown into adults, Chaoba Nongthon honored this agreement by formally arranging their marriage.

Before dying, he entrusted two wooden chests of family treasures to Thonglen, one for Khuman Khamba, and another one for Khamnu. He also asked Thonglen, Chaoba Nongthon, and Kabui Salang Maiba to care for his children. Khuman Puremba later died.

=== Departure of Arai Leima ===
Puremba's wife died soon after his death. In Moirang Kangleirol tradition of Meitei mythology and folklore, after his death, goddess Arai Leima, alias human Ngangkha Leima, was required by divine order to return to heaven. Although she wished to stay with her children, she had no choice and left the earthly realm.

== Legacy ==
Khuman Puremba's legacy as a strong, fearless, and courageous warrior was continued by his son Khuman Khamba, who later surpassed his father in fame and strength. In Meitei society, strong men in body, behavior, or mindset are often compared to Khuman Puremba, Khuman Khamba, or both, even in modern times.

== See also ==
- Khuman Kangleirol
- Moirang Kangleirol
- Khumanlol
- Khuman language
- Khuman Apokpa

== Bibliography ==
- Hodson, Thomas Callan. The Meitheis. India: D. Nutt, 1908.
- Rainā, Vimalā. Khamba Thoibi and Poems on Manipur. India: Printed at the Government Press, Manipur, 1963.
