= Thangarakpa =

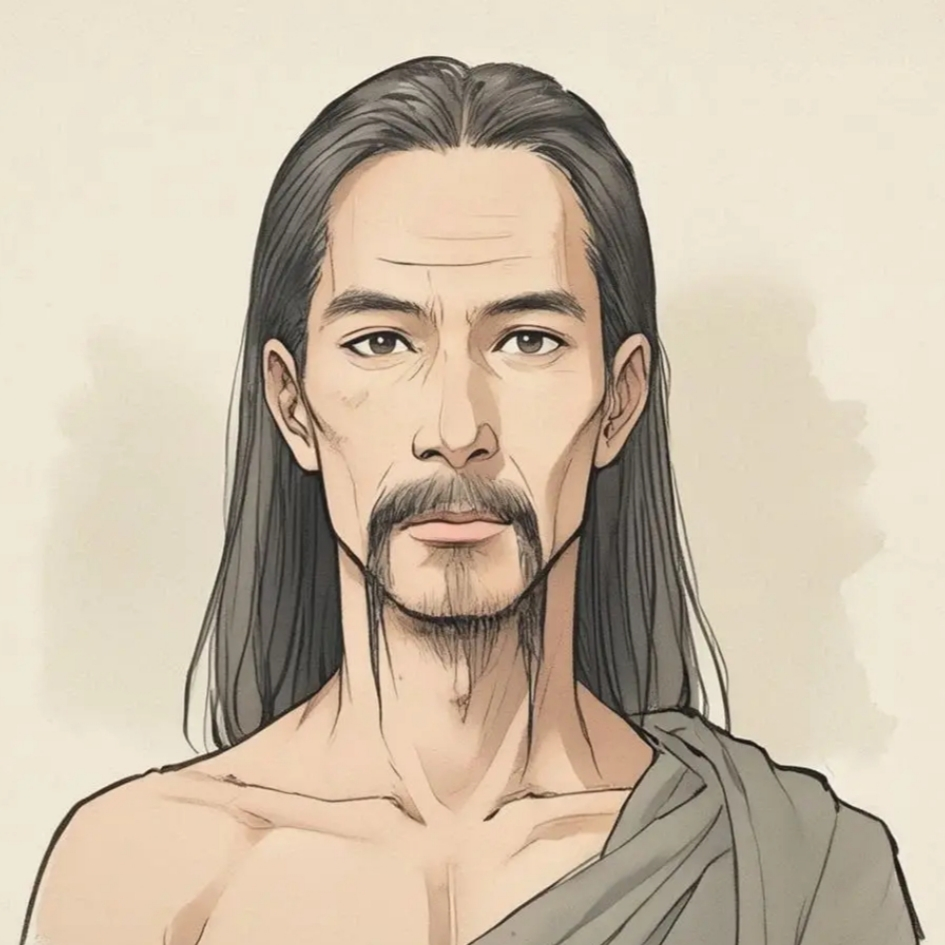
A portrait of Thangalakpa (alias Thangarakpa)

Thangarakpa (ꯊꯥꯡꯒꯔꯥꯛꯄ), also spelled Thangalakpa (ꯊꯥꯡꯒꯂꯥꯛꯄ), was a minister, official, and regional headman in the Moirang kingdom during the time following the death of the warrior Puremba. He is a character in the Moirang Kangleirol legends, known for his initial hostility toward Puremba's children and later partial remorse for his actions.

== Official position ==
Thangarakpa held dual roles in the Moirang kingdom: he was both a minister and the headman (Lakpa) of the Thanga region, which gave him authority over local governance and the enforcement of law in his jurisdiction. His position allowed him to exercise control over both property and people, including oversight of local residents and the ability to harass or restrict access to resources.

== Enmity with Puremba’s family ==
Thangarakpa maintained a personal enmity toward the late warrior Puremba, stemming from prior conflicts during Puremba's life. After Puremba's death, Thangarakpa extended his hostility to the orphaned children, Khamba and Khamnu, reflecting the continuation of grudges across generations in the social hierarchy of Moirang.

=== Harassment and torture of Khamba and Khamnu ===
As children, Khamba and Khamnu experienced multiple hardships caused by Thangarakpa's hostility. He frequently harassed the siblings, obstructed their access to basic resources, and created obstacles in their daily lives. In one incident, he snatched a cloth from Khamnu that she used to carry her younger brother Khamba and threatened her with punishment if the Kao (bull), the late Puremba's pet, caused any damage to neighboring properties.

These actions forced the children into extreme poverty and hardship, compelling Khamnu to beg for food and work in various households, such as winnowing or grinding rice, while also caring for her infant brother. The siblings’ reliance on the Kao bull, who had been freed from bondage, was complicated by Thangarakpa's threats, illustrating the oppressive challenges imposed by the official on the children of his late enemy.

== Later interaction with Khamba and Khamnu ==
When Khamba and Khamnu grew into adulthood, they approached Thangarakpa's household to request garments suitable for public appearances. Thangarakpa initially refused the request and scolded Khamnu harshly, causing her to leave in tears. Upon seeing his sister cry, Khamba displayed his strength by shaking the pillars of Thangarakpa's house, intimidating both Thangarakpa and his wife, Thangalakpi. Thangalakpi advised her husband to provide garments to the siblings, but by the time they attempted compliance, Khamba and Khamnu had already left. This event caused Thangarakpa to feel remorse for his past mistreatment, although his previous actions had already contributed to the siblings’ early hardships.

== Depiction ==
Thangarakpa is depicted as a figure whose abuse of power and personal grudge contrasts with the virtues of Khamba and Khamnu. His role in the stories shows the difficulties faced by orphaned children in a feudal society, the consequences of inherited enmity, and the moral lesson that judgment based on familial ties rather than individual merit can lead to injustice.

== Legacy ==
In the Moirang Kangleirol tales, Thangarakpa is remembered both for his oppression of Puremba's children and his later recognition of wrongdoing. While he never became a hero, his interactions with Khamba and Khamnu show the socio-political challenges in the Moirang kingdom.

== See also ==
- Khuyol Haoba and Yaithing Konu
