= Senu =

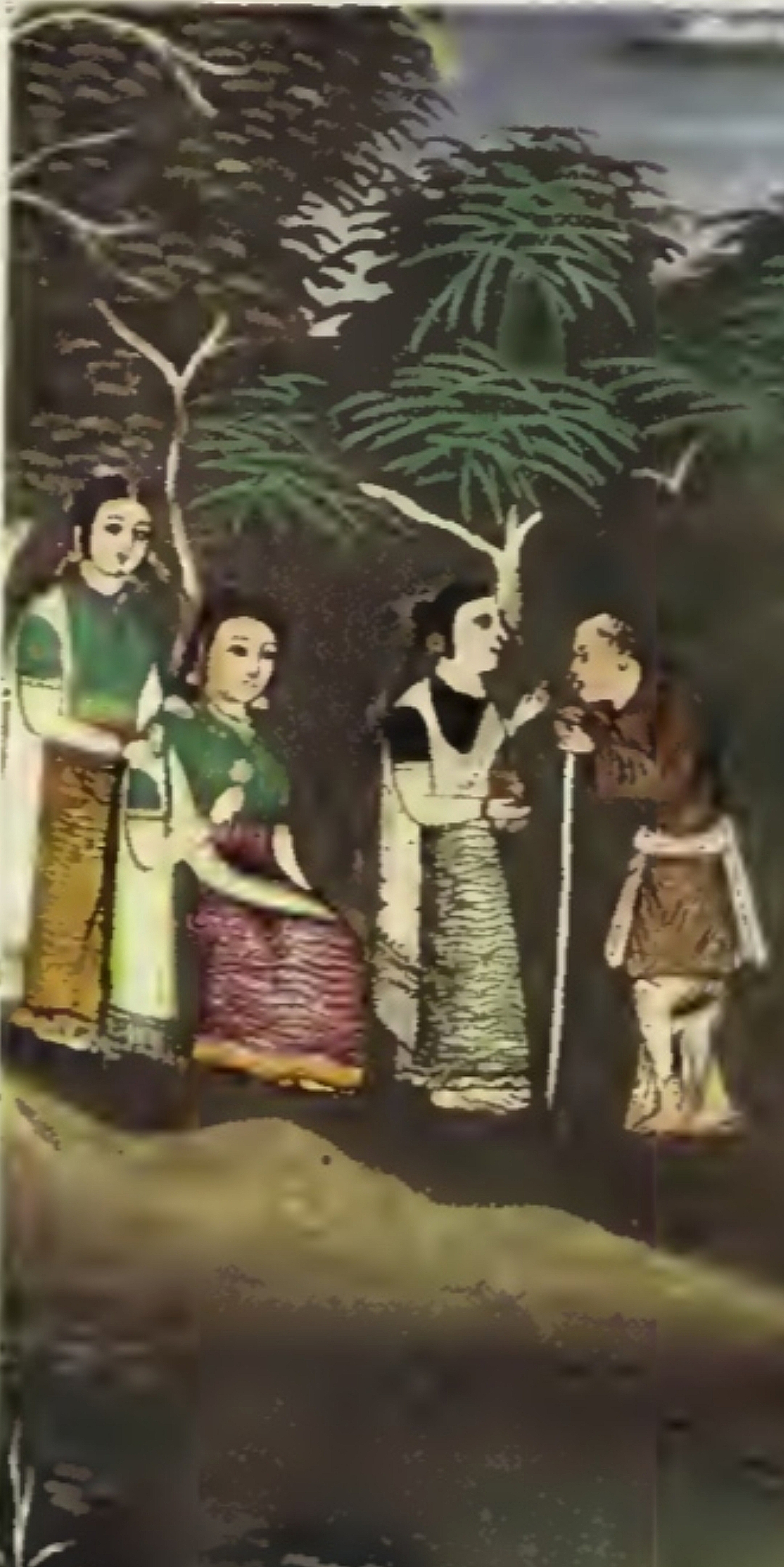
Senu accompanying Thoibi and other people

Senu (ꯁꯦꯅꯨ), also spelled as Shenu, originally Sennu or Shennu (ꯁꯦꯟꯅꯨ), was an achanbi (favorite maid) and a close friend of Princess Thoibi of the ancient Moirang kingdom. She was loyal to Thoibi and supported her whenever possible. She was an important character in the Khamba Thoibi classical epic of Moirang Kangleirol genre of Meitei mythology and folklore.

== Name ==
The name Senu (ꯁꯦꯅꯨ), also spelled Shenu, is derived from Sennu or Shennu (ꯁꯦꯟꯅꯨ) in the Meitei language. It comes from Sen/Shen (ꯁꯦꯟ), meaning to look after or to take care, combined with Nu (ꯅꯨ), a feminine suffix.

== Role and character ==
Senu knew the private wishes and feelings of Princess Thoibi. She often acted on Thoibi's signals and helped her in secret matters. At times, Senu distracted other people when Thoibi wanted privacy.

=== Relationship with Princess Thoibi ===
Senu had a trusted relationship with Princess Thoibi. She worked for Thoibi at all times and helped her meet Khuman Khamba, who later became Thoibi's husband.

== Notable events ==
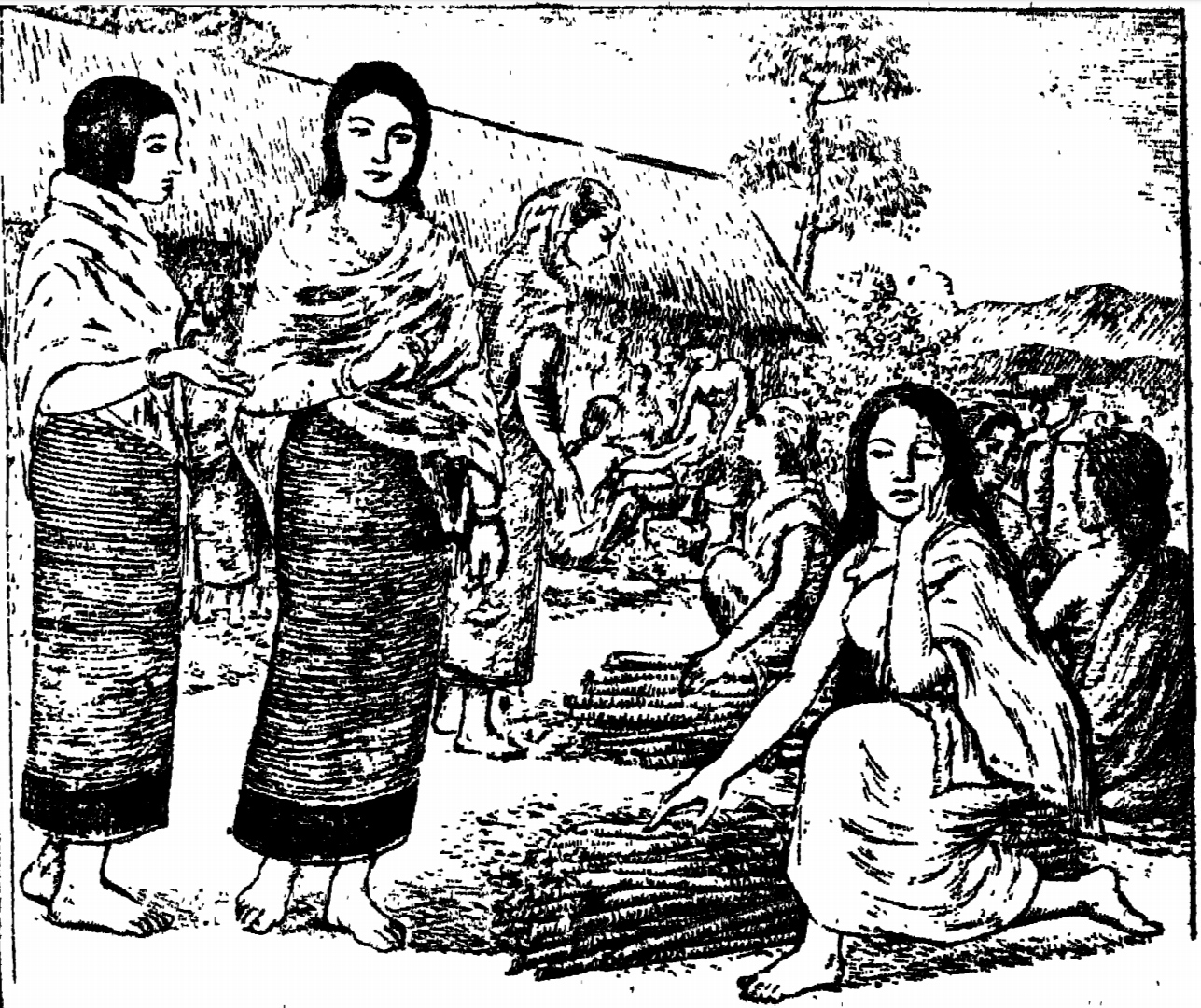
Senu accompanying Thoibi in the marketplace to meet Khamnu

During the first meeting between Thoibi and Khuman Khamba at the verandah of Thoibi's father's house, Senu welcomed Khamba after receiving a secret signal from Thoibi.

Senu accompanied Thoibi during the traditional indoor game of playing kang. In this game, Thoibi was able to meet Khuman Khamba at the play station.

Senu also went with Thoibi to the women-only fishing event called Een Chingba (ꯏꯟ ꯆꯤꯡꯕ) at Loktak Lake. When Khuman Khamba arrived there suddenly, Senu received a signal from Thoibi and distracted the other women. This left Thoibi alone with Khuman Khamba in the middle of the lake.

== Separation and reunion with Thoibi ==
Senu could not accompany Princess Thoibi when Thoibi was exiled to the Kabaw (Kabo) region, a tributary region of the Moirang kingdom. The exile was ordered by Thoibi's father, Crown Prince Chingkhu Akhuba. Senu remained in Moirang during this time. They reunited after Princess Thoibi returned from exile.

== See also ==
- Toro (Khamba Thoibi)
- Women in Meitei civilisation
