= Wangkhei Khoiya =

Wangkhei Khoiya (ꯋꯥꯡꯈꯩ ꯈꯣꯏꯌꯥ) was a Meitei warrior of the Mangang clan in ancient Kangleipak (early Manipur). He is notably mentioned in the classical Meitei literary chronicle Chainarol (An Account of Combats). He is remembered for his victorious duel against Haoba Athouba, a warrior of the Khuman clan. His story shows the complex values of martial honour, physical strength, and personal prestige upheld in ancient Meitei civilisation.

== Background ==
Wangkhei Khoiya belonged to the Wangkhei locality of the Meitei community, which was historically associated with notable warriors, nobles, and craftsmen. During the era recorded in the Chainarol, Meitei warriors often engaged in formalized single combats with their counterparts from other clans such as the Khuman, Moirang, and others. These combats were often symbolic, upholding clan honour and settling disputes without large-scale warfare.

== Combat with Haoba Athouba ==
Wangkhei Khoiya's most prominent appearance in historical ancient Meitei literature comes from his duel with Haoba Athouba, a Khuman warrior. According to the Chainarol, the two engaged in ritual combat governed by a strict code of conduct.

During the fight, Khoiya managed to severely wound Haoba Athouba in the neck, causing the Khuman to flee the field in search of help from his clansmen. Despite Athouba's attempt to escape, Khoiya pursued, overpowered, and killed him. As was customary, Khoiya then beheaded his fallen opponent, hoisting the severed head on a pole as a trophy of victory and as a symbol of personal and communal triumph.

== See also ==
- Meitei confederacy
- Meitei warrior traditions
- Khuman warrior traditions
- Meitei martial arts
- Meitei traditional weapons
- Khuman kingdom
- Moirang kingdom
- Khuman Kangleirol
- Moirang Kangleirol
