= Ponglen Hanba =

First historical king of Moirang and the introducer of the worship of Lord Thangjing

- Iwang Puriklai / Moirang Ningthou

King of Moirang
- Monarch: 52 BC – 28 AD
- Predecessor: Iwang Puriklai Sunacha
- Successor: Iwang Puriklai Telheiba
- Spouse: Memtomnu of Khuman; Nganba Thongraiba of Nganba
Names
- Iwang Puriklai Phang Phang Ponglen Hanba
- House: Moirang dynasty
- Religion: Sanamahism
- Occupation: FIrst historical ruler of the Moirang Kingdom

Iwang Puriklai Phang Phang Ponglen Hanba, also known as Phang Phang Ponglen Hanba (Meitei: ꯐꯪ ꯐꯪ ꯄꯣꯡꯂꯦꯟ ꯍꯟꯕꯥ) was an early king of the Moirang Kingdom, an ancient kingdom of Kangleipak (early Manipur). He ruled from 52 BC to 28 AD.

He is traditionally recognized as the first human king of Moirang. His reign is widely regarded as the beginning of Moirang's chronological royal history.

== Historical context ==
According to the royal chronicle known as the Moirang Ningthourol Lambuba, seven rulers are listed before Phang Phang Ponglen Hanba, though their reigns are undated and regarded as mythological or semi-legendary in nature. The accession of Ponglen Hanba in 52 BC is generally accepted by scholars as marking the commencement of Moirang's recorded dynastic chronology.

== Worship of Lord Thangjing ==
An odd thing happened during his rule. The young girls and boys did not grin. The kids didn't cry. The cocks did not crow, and the dogs did not bark. Thangyai Leihoubi, the King's daughter, asked about this strange occurrence. Following a divination, the priest Thingkol Miribacha disclosed that the King had neglected to carry out the ceremonies and offerings to Ibudhou Thangjing. Normalcy was restored as soon as the rites were carried out in accordance with Ibudhou Thangjing's instructions.

Ibudhou Thangjing was to be worshipped by the fifteen thoyas (Leikais). However, only eight Leikais were requested to gather in front of Moirang Kangla Utra. The Moirang Thangjing Lai Haraoba was thus started. Ngangkha, Khoyol, Nganglou, Khambi, Higa, Okchin, Chenglei, and Yaoshu were the eight leikais. Khori, Ngangkha, Nongkhrangpokpi, Aaun, Okchil, Higa, Chenglei, and Yaos were the nine markets.

== Reign ==
Ponglen Hanba's reign is noted for several foundational reforms and cultural developments in the Moirang polity:

- He institutionalized the tradition of royal coronation ceremonies held at Keke Kangla, the sacred capital and spiritual seat of Moirang.
- He introduced the practice of a symbolic ritual known as the "coronation war", conducted near the Loktak Lake, meant to assert territorial dominion and divine legitimacy.
- A monumental seven-tiered palace was constructed under his reign at Keke Kangla, which served as both a royal residence and a center for administrative and ritual affairs.
- He introduced a system of territorial administration by dividing the kingdom into eight leikais (wards), each containing nine market zones, indicating a sophisticated model of governance.

== See also ==
- Moirang Shayon
- Codrus

== Bibliography ==
- Lisam, Khoidom Singh (2011). Encyclopaedia of Manipur (3 Vol.). Gyan Publishing House. ISBN 9788178358642.
- Goshwami, Hareshwar. History of the People of Manipur.
- Moyon, Rev Dr Koningthung Ngoru (2023). The Lost Kingdom of Moyon (Bujuur): Iruwng (King) Kuurkam Ngoruw Moyon & The People of Manipur. Shashwat Publication. ISBN 9788119517312.
