= Kabui Salang Maiba =

In Meitei mythology and folklore, Kabui Salang Maiba (Old Manipuri: Kapui Salang Maipa) may refer to:

- a maiba who turned into Keibu Keioiba (Kabui Keioiba)
- Kabui Salang Maiba (Khamba Thoibi), a maiba of Kabui Salang community mentioned in the classical epic story of Khamba Thoibi
- a maiba who killed Poubi Lai
