= Kabui Salang Maiba (Khamba Thoibi) =

Kabui Salang Maiba (ꯀꯕꯨꯏ ꯁꯂꯥꯡ ꯃꯥꯏꯕ) was a chief and maiba medicine man of the Kabui tribals living in the Salangthel hills, a region under the influence of the Moirang kingdom in ancient Manipur. He is remembered for his leadership of the Salangthel people, his skills in medicine and healing, and his close association with the Khuman-Moirang warrior Puremba and his family.

== Leadership and authority ==
Kabui Salang Maiba served as the tribal chief of the Salangthel hills. During his leadership, the Moirang kingdom required the Kabui tribals to pay annual tribute. On several occasions, he attempted to assert independence by resisting tribute collection, often assembling a small army of his men. Despite these efforts, his forces were usually defeated by the larger and better-trained Moirang army. On one occasion, however, he succeeded in withholding the tribute for a year, prompting the Moirang king Chingkhu Telheiba to send his most formidable warrior, Puremba, to enforce compliance.

== Interaction with Puremba ==
Kabui Salang Maiba developed a close personal relationship with Puremba after the warrior demonstrated his extraordinary strength and skill. Puremba lifted a massive rock in the Salangthel region, which the tribesmen could not move collectively, causing them to submit without battle. He also captured a wild bull that had been damaging the crops of the Salangthel hills and brought it back to Moirang. These acts impressed Kabui Salang Maiba and led to a strong friendship between the chief and the warrior.

Kabui Salang Maiba later benefited personally from Puremba’s assistance. When he wished to marry a woman whose father demanded a test of combat for suitors, Puremba defeated the father in a duel and presented the woman to Kabui Salang Maiba, enabling the marriage. This created a lasting bond of trust and loyalty between the chief and Puremba.

== Role in raising Khamnu and Khamba ==
After the death of Puremba and the return of Ngangkha Leima to heaven, Kabui Salang Maiba, along with his wife Kabui Salang Maibi, took in Puremba’s orphaned children, Khamnu and Khamba, and raised them until they reached adulthood. Salang Maiba had a personal connection to the children because of his past friendship with Puremba and the help Puremba had provided in his own marriage. Salang Maibi, having no biological children, also cared deeply for the siblings.

Kabui Salang Maiba guided Khamba in training, testing his strength by having him lift the rock that Puremba had thrown in the past, thereby confirming that Khamba had inherited his father’s remarkable abilities. He also provided assistance when the children later returned to Moirang, ensuring their safety and supporting them in their endeavors, such as obtaining gifts and resources for the young Khamba’s interactions with Princess Thoibi.

== Skills and reputation ==
Kabui Salang Maiba was not only a political and tribal leader but also recognized as a medicine man (Maiba), skilled in healing and spiritual practices. His wisdom and abilities in both leadership and medicine were significant for the welfare of the Salangthel people and for maintaining ties with the Moirang kingdom.

== Legacy ==
Kabui Salang Maiba is remembered as a loyal friend to Puremba and a protector of his family. Through his care of Khamnu and Khamba, he played a key role in preserving the Khuman lineage in Moirang and contributed to the upbringing of Khamba, who became the hero of the Meitei classical epic Khamba Thoibi. Alongside his wife, Kabui Salang Maibi, he is celebrated for his dedication to the children of his friend and for his combined role as tribal chief and healer.

== See also ==
- Traditional medicine
