= Khana Chaoba =

In Meitei mythology and folklore, Khana Chaoba or Chauba (meaning, "great in South" or "Southern Lord", in Meitei language), may refer to:

- Wangpulen, the God of water
- Lok Ningthou, the God of streams, a son of Wangpulen
