= Moirang Kangla =

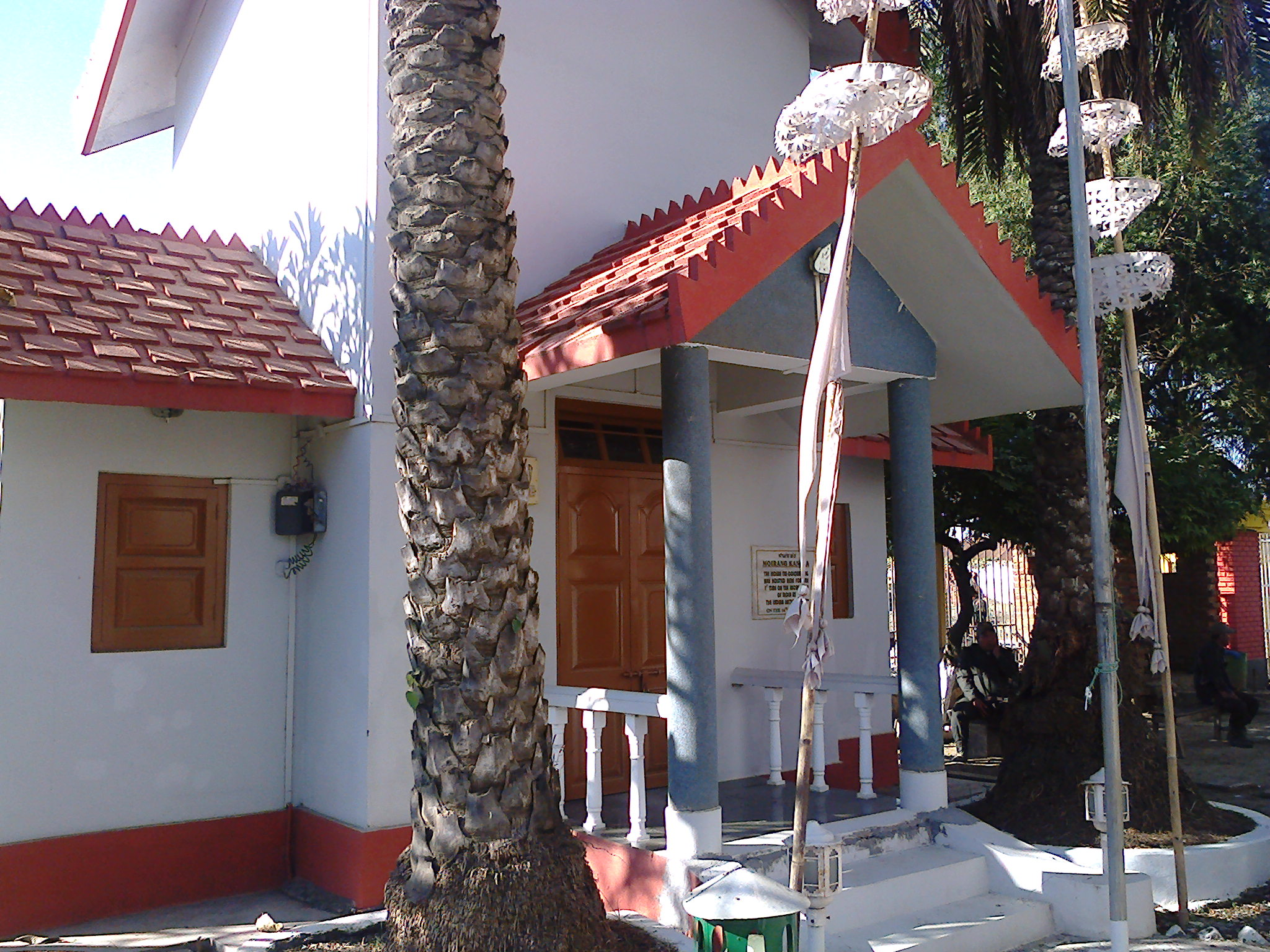
A traditional Meitei temple in Moirang Kangla site, in modern-day INA Memorial Complex

Moirang Kangla (ꯃꯣꯏꯔꯥꯡ ꯀꯪꯂꯥ), also known as Keke Kangla (ꯀꯦꯀꯦ ꯀꯪꯂꯥ) or Kege Kangla (ꯀꯦꯒꯦ ꯀꯡꯂꯥ), is a sacred historical site of Moirang. At present, it exists as a small dome-shaped temple inside the INA Martyrs' Memorial Complex. The site has long been regarded as holy, and people of Moirang traditionally offered prayers and ritual offerings there every year.

It was the royal palace site of the ancient kings of Moirang. The palace complex is thought to have covered a large area, including the present Moirang Market (Awoon Keithel) and Khamnu Market.

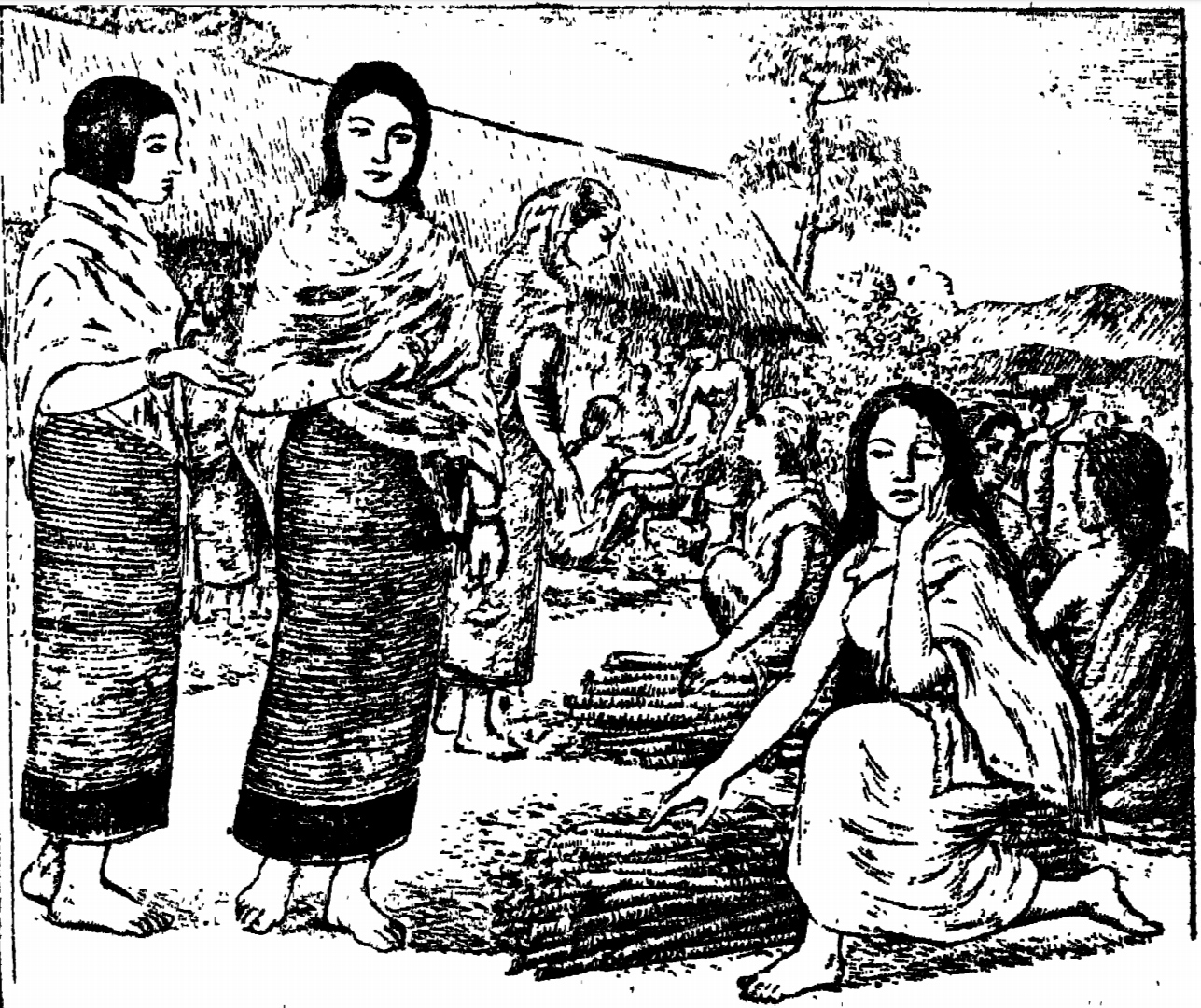
A scene of a marketplace of ancient Moirang, which is considered to be a part of the Moirang Kangla palatial complex, where Princess Thoibi met Khamnu

== Structure and functions ==
Within the Kangla campus, a homestead-like structure known as Kangla Thon Taret Tholangmei, a seven-storeyed building, is believed to have existed. According to tradition, it served many purposes, including:

- A conference hall for the king and his 64 Phamdon (courtiers or knights)
- A coronation site for Moirang kings
- A place for keeping the Yaipung (a large drum)
- A site for punishment and hanging of convicted persons
- A sacred place called Nungoibi Lalu Chanpham, where prayers and vows were made and offerings of enemy heads were performed
- An indoor area used as a small playground

All these functions are believed to have taken place within the Kangla complex.

== Religious practices and rituals ==
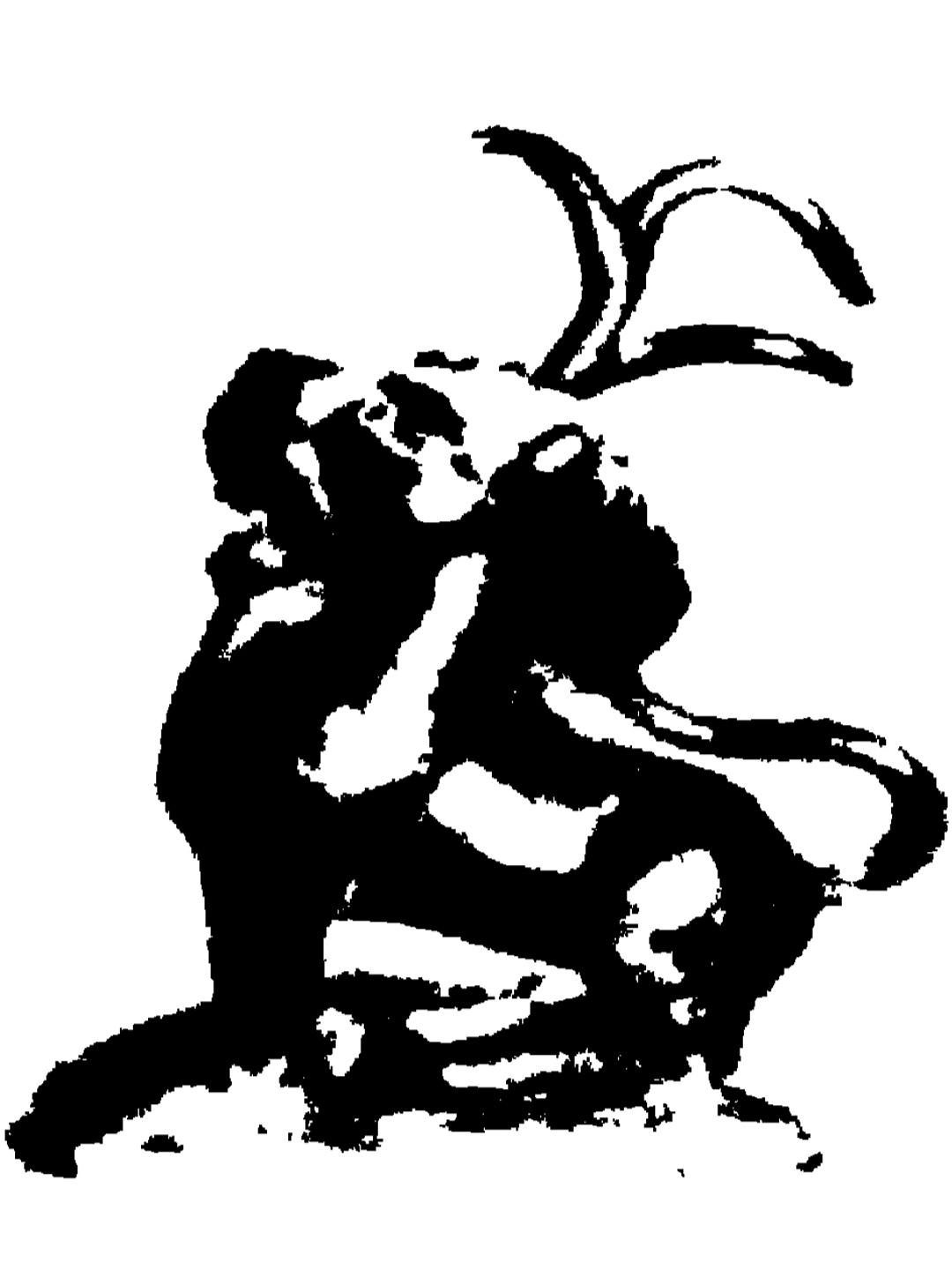
Structure of a holy tiger, having 3 pronged tips of a single horn on its forehead, the front one in brass color, the middle one in golden & the last one in silver color, being a divine form of God Atingkok, supposedly placed in the Moirang Kangla

Through the ages, a ritual known as Kangla Mang Changba was conducted at Moirang Kangla. This ritual involved receiving divine messages known as Laipao from Eputhou, conveyed through Amaiba and Amaibi. These rituals were performed when the king, the kingdom, or the people faced suffering due to natural disasters or other hardships.

== Decline ==
In ancient Manipur, Kanglas (palaces) of each Yek Salai kingdom were the primary targets during conquests aimed at overthrowing kings. Similarly, the decline of the independent Moirang kingdom began after the death of Moirang King Iwang Puriklai Sanahongba in 1432 AD, during the reign of King Meitenggoo Ningthou Khomba of the Ningthouja dynasty.

The domination of Moirang by the Ningthouja kings was fully established in 1767 AD. This occurred when the Moirang king Khellei Nungnang Telheiba, who was the maternal uncle of King Chingthangkhomba (Bheigyachandra) of the Ningthouja dynasty, was killed on the bank of the Ningthee River through a conspiracy involving men of the Meitei king.

== Destruction and suppression ==
After Moirang lost its independence, Keke Kangla was destroyed. For many years, its exact location remained unknown. During the period of domination, religious practices were severely restricted. Even during the reign of King Meitengoo Chandrakirti of the Ningthouja dynasty, offerings and rituals to Moirang's own deities were completely banned.

As an example, two Amaibas of Moirang were punished by the Meitei king for performing prayers related to Karang Then Kaba. For a long time, Moirang Kangla was neither preserved nor worshipped in its original religious form. Only a small hut, built by Kumam Kanglen Singh and his family, existed on a natural raised platform inside the present INA complex for preservation and worship.

== Rediscovery and reconstruction ==
In 1968, during excavation work for the construction of the INA complex, the sacred passage and hole of Keke Kangla were rediscovered and identified by Amaibas. The holy opening had been covered by an earthen plate called Kekam, which had small holes in its center and was placed upside down.

Evidence found during excavation, such as charcoal from weeds and plants, hair, gold pieces, and beads, suggested that the destruction of the Kangla had occurred suddenly, possibly during the night.

=== Keke Kangla Waphongba ceremony (1968) ===
The Keke Kangla Waphongba, meaning declaration and recognition or reconstruction ceremony, was held on Friday, 20 September 1968. The ceremony was organized by the then (titular) King of Moirang, Konjengbam Kamal Singh, who was also President of the Moirang Thangjing Yageirel Marup group, with the support of the Phamnaiba Loishang (council).

The ceremony was attended by dignitaries including the Chief Commissioner, Chief Minister, and Education Minister of Manipur.

The ritual duties were performed by:

- Sanglakpa: Moirangthem Chaoval Singh
- Amaiba Hanba: Maibram Sekho Singh
- Aseihanba: Moirangthem Ibomcha Singh
- Other Amaibas: Naran Singh and Bonomali Singh

From that day onward, Keke Kangla was restored and reopened to the people for prayer and worship. The ceremony also confirmed that coronation rituals were practiced in the ancient kingdom of Moirang.

== First coronation ==
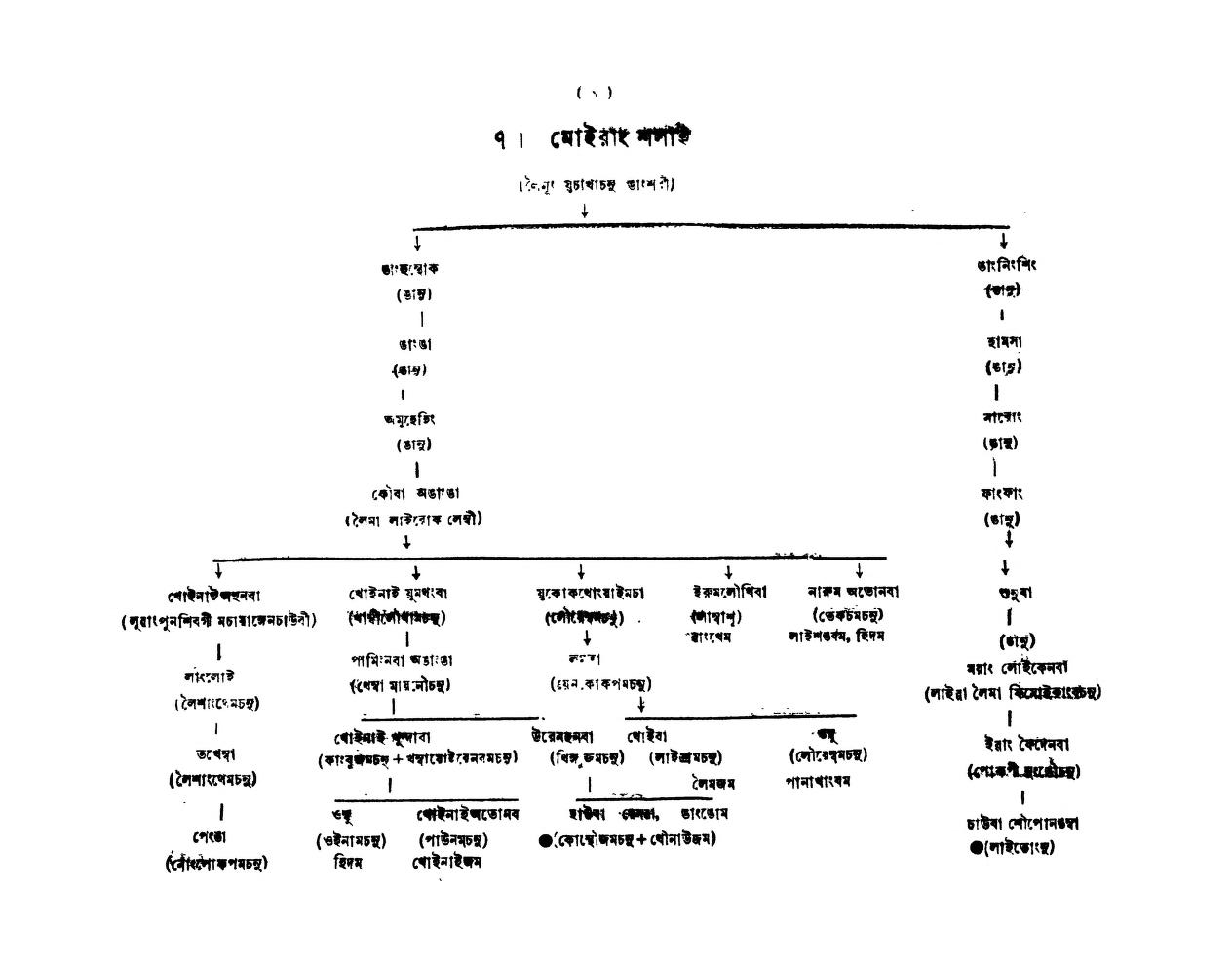
Genealogy of the earliest known rulers of ancient Moirang kingdom

The first crowned king of Keke Moirang was Phang Phang Ponglenhanba, the eighth king in Moirang genealogy from Ngangningsing (Ngang Ningsinga). After reconstructing and expanding the Kangla complex, he introduced the system of royal coronation at Keke Kangla.

He ruled independently as Ewang Puriklai Phang Phang Ponglenhanba from 52 BC to 28 AD, and is regarded as the first human king of Moirang. During that period, it was customary for a newly crowned king to expand the kingdom by invading neighboring areas.

== Description in the Puyas ==
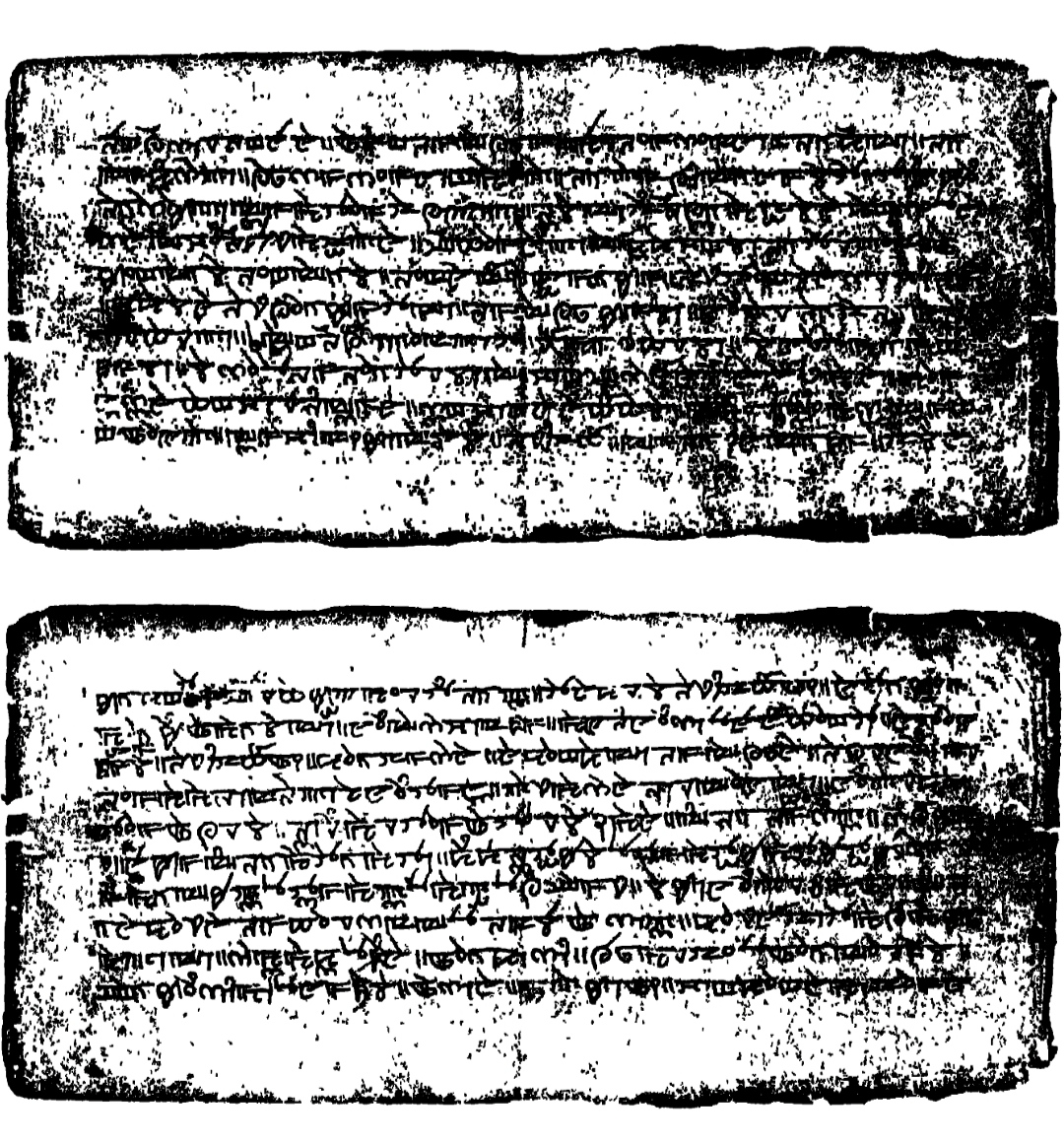
An ancient Meitei language text (puya) about the Moirang Kangleirol (Moirang Kangleiron) written in old Meetei script

Ancient manuscripts (Puya) describe Keke Kangla as a large, symbolic, seven-storeyed structure. It is portrayed as a sacred place for victory, defeat, reward, punishment, birth, and death. The building is described as beautifully decorated, brightly painted in white, red, or black, and adorned with images of gods, humans, animals, dragons, boats, and fishing scenes. It is presented as a unique and sacred structure, praised by people from both hills and plains, and regarded as eternal.

== Hoisting of the INA Flag (1944) ==
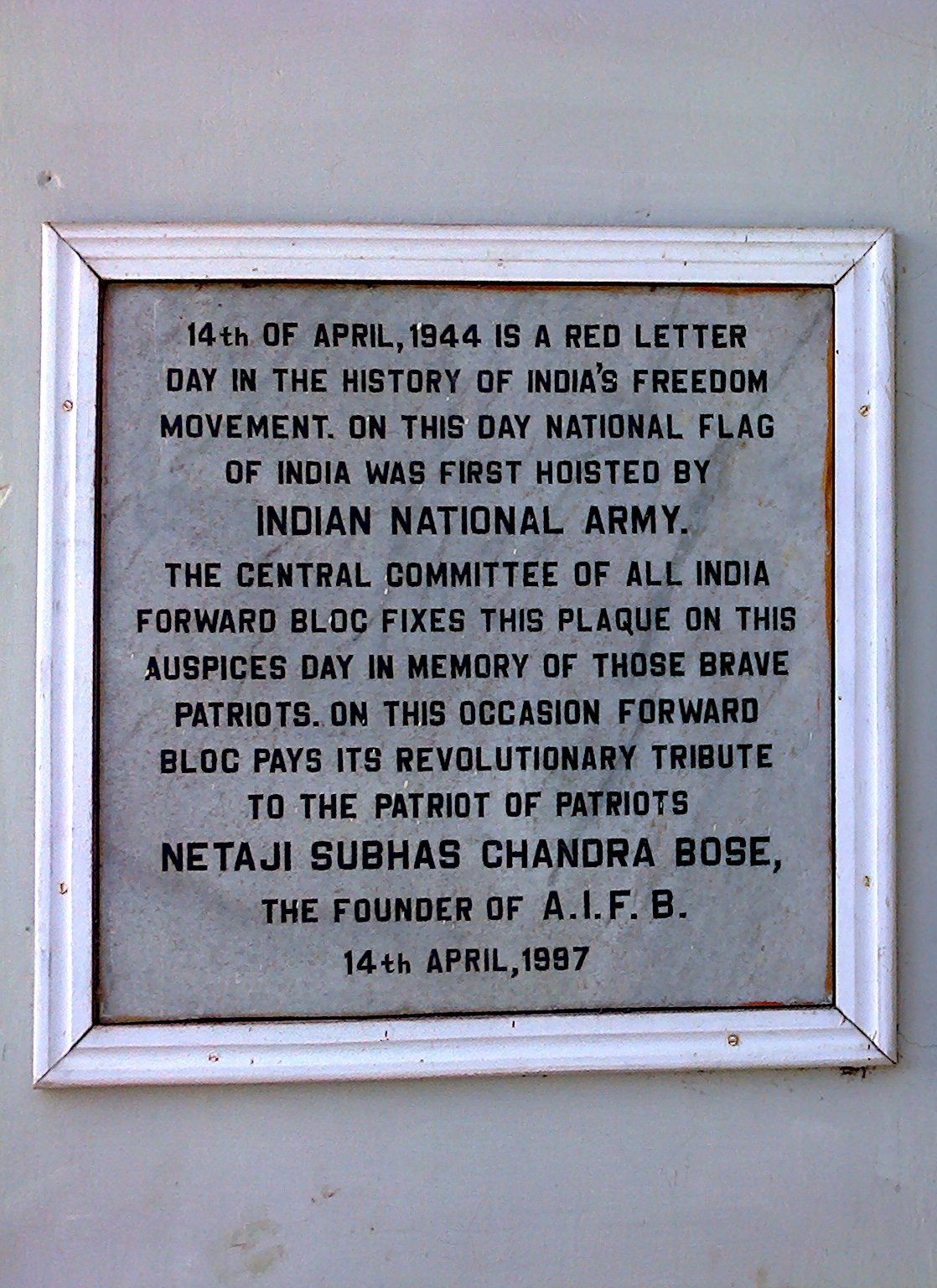
INA Memorial Complex in Moirang

During World War II, the first tricolor flag of the Indian National Army (INA) was hoisted on Indian soil at Moirang Kangla around 5:00 PM on 14 April 1944.

On this occasion, INA and Japanese forces conducted a march-past on the western bank of the Moirang River in front of Moirang Kangla. About one hundred people gathered to celebrate the news of liberation, though many residents stayed away due to fear of war.

Army leaders present included Colonel S. A. Malik, Captain Ito, and Naqi Ahmad Chowdhuri. Local leaders, led by M. Koireng Singh, were also present at the event.

== See also ==
- Moilang
- Moirang Ningthourol Lambuba
- Moirang Kangleirol
- Epic cycles of incarnations in Moirang
- Khamba Thoibi
