= Ngangkha Leima =

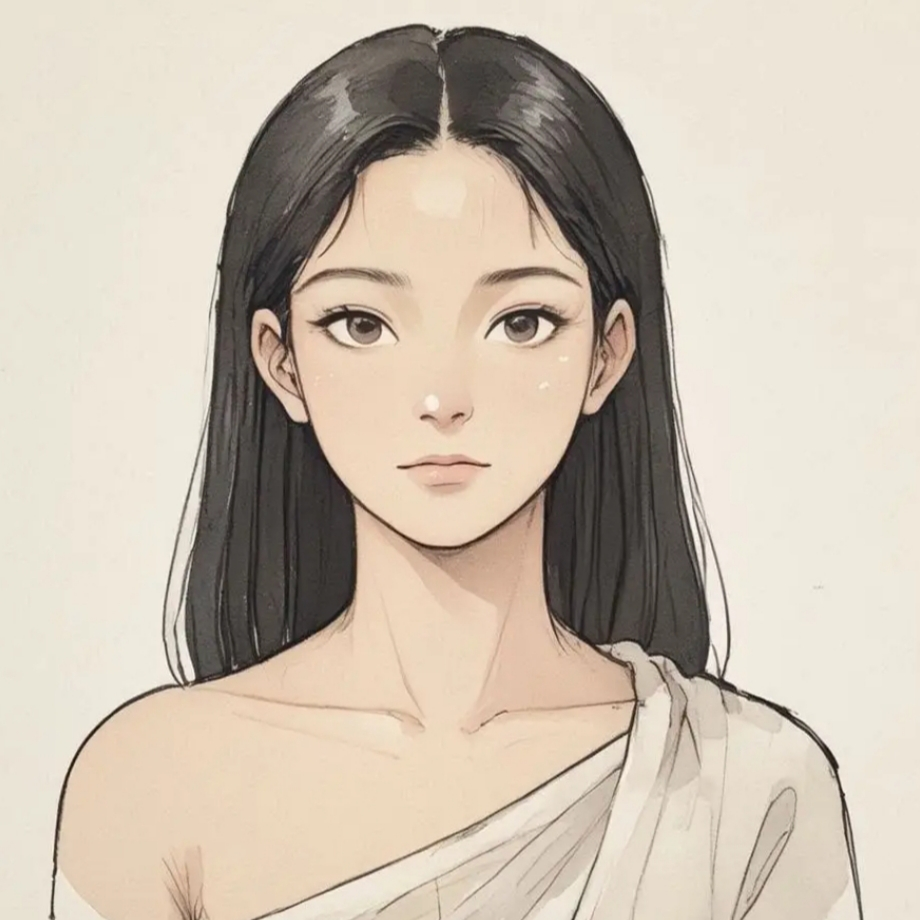
Lady Ngangkha Leima

Arai Leima (ꯑꯔꯥꯏ ꯂꯩꯃ), better known as Ngangkha Leima (ꯉꯥꯡꯈꯥ ꯂꯩꯃ) or Ngangkhareima (ꯉꯥꯡꯈꯔꯩꯃ), is a figure from the traditions of the ancient Moirang kingdom. She is a goddess, one of the seven celestial daughters of the Sky God. In Moirang Kangleirol tradition of Meitei mythology and folklore, she is closely connected with the lives of Mungyang Chaoba, his rebirth Puremba, and their children, including Khuman Khamba, a central hero of the classical Meitei epic Khamba Thoibi.

== Divine origin ==
Ngangkha Leima was originally known as Arai Leima, the youngest and most beautiful of seven celestial sisters. They descended from heaven to secretly bathe in the pond of Mungyang Chaoba. After being discovered by him, Arai Leima was required to live as the wife of Mungyang Chaoba until his natural death. Because his death was not natural, she was not allowed to return to heaven and had to wait for his rebirth.

== Meeting with Puremba ==
Mungyang Chaoba was reborn as Khuman Puremba, a warrior of the Moirang kingdom. After he had grown into a famed fighter, Arai Leima waited for him in the human world.

While Puremba was returning to Moirang from a distant place, Arai Leima appeared before him in the Ngangkha Lawai region. She stopped him, asked him to dismount, and spoke to him as a lonely maiden. She told him that she had long dreamed of becoming his wife and asked him to take her home as his spouse.

Puremba agreed and took her with him on his horse.

== Naming as Ngangkha Leima ==
Before returning home, Puremba went to meet the king of Moirang for official reasons. He left the woman waiting on his horse at the palace gate. When she later entered the palace to call him, the king saw her and became attracted to her.

The king demanded that Puremba give her to him as his consort. Unable to refuse the king, Puremba reluctantly gave her to him. Her divine identity was not known, and she did not reveal it. Believing her to be a human woman from the Ngangkha Lawai region, the king named her Ngangkha Leima, meaning “Lady of Ngangkha.”

== Life with the king ==
Ngangkha Leima lived with the king of Moirang and became pregnant. She gave birth to a daughter named Khamnu, who was the king's child but the childbirth happened in Puremba's house.

== Reunion with Puremba ==
=== Intervention of God Thangjing ===
God Thangjing, the guardian deity of the Moirang kingdom, intervened again, to reunite Ngangkha Leima alias Arai Leima with Puremba. He sent nine divine servants to the human world, transforming them into nine ferocious tigers. These tigers caused destruction among the people and could not be defeated by any warrior except Puremba.

To stop the tigers, the king organized a grand public event in the Torbung region. Warriors attempted to fight the tigers as the king watched from a raised bamboo platform.

=== Victory of Puremba ===
The nine tigers appeared in three groups of three. Each time, all warriors fled except Puremba, who defeated all nine tigers in three separate encounters. After each victory, the king rewarded him with titles, positions, and lands.

After the final battle, the king had nothing left to give except his most valued possession, Ngangkha Leima. He gave her back to Puremba.

== Motherhood and departure to heaven ==
With Puremba, Ngangkha Leima gave birth to a son named Khuman Khamba. Shortly after Khamba's birth, Puremba died.

Ngangkha Leima was heartbroken. As a goddess, she knew she had to return to heaven, even though she did not wish to leave her young children. She eventually returned to heaven.

Her daughter Khamnu took on a motherly role and raised her younger brother Khamba.

Khamba later became a strong warrior and the male protagonist of the classical Meitei romantic epic Khamba Thoibi, alongside Princess Thoibi of the Moirang kingdom.

Ngangkha Leima is remembered as a divine figure whose life connects the heavenly world with the royal and heroic traditions of ancient Moirang.

== See also ==
- Helloi
  - Nganu Leima
  - Khunu Leima
  - Shapi Leima
- Hingchabi
