= Mungyang Chaoba =

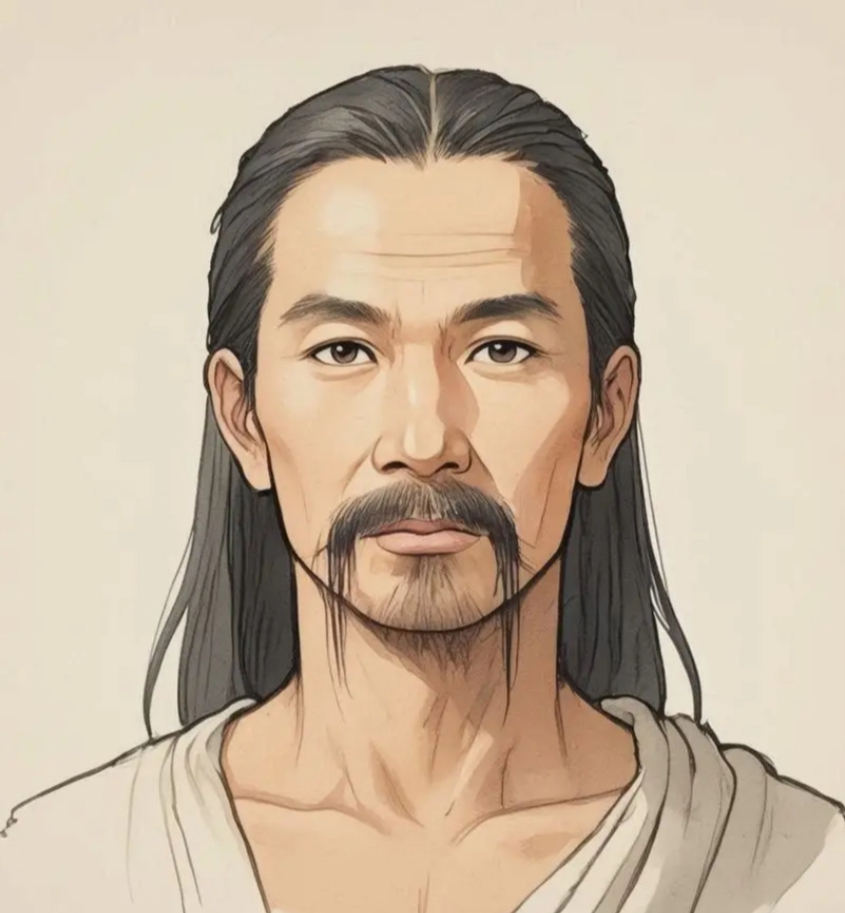
Mungyang Chaoba, the gardener who married a goddess and died

Mungyang Chaoba (ꯃꯨꯡꯌꯥꯡ ꯆꯥꯎꯕ) is a figure from the ancient Moirang kingdom. He is mentioned in the Moirang Kangleirol genre of traditional Meitei mythology and Meitei folklore. He is known as a gardener and is associated with a myth involving celestial beings, divine punishment, rebirth, and the origin of a heroic lineage.

== Gardener in Moirang ==
Mungyang Chaoba lived in a distant village of the Moirang kingdom. He regularly traveled to his garden, which was located far from human settlements. The garden was known for its beauty and contained many flowers, fruits, and a pond with very clean water. He carefully maintained the garden and the pond by himself.

=== Seven celestial daughters ===
According to the story, seven celestial daughters of the Sky God wished to bathe in pure water on Earth. From heaven, they looked down and searched for water suitable for bathing and play. They found only the pond in Mungyang Chaoba's garden to be worthy.

At night, especially in darkness, the seven daughters descended from the sky. They bathed and played in the pond, plucked lotus and lilies, and took flowers and fruits from the garden. They always left before sunrise and were not seen by humans.

=== Discovery of the damage ===
Mungyang Chaoba noticed that his pond and garden were repeatedly damaged. Each time, he repaired the damage and returned home, but the same destruction appeared again the next morning. This happened many times.

One night, he decided to stay hidden in the garden. He carried a large stick and waited through the night.

== Capture of the celestial daughters ==
During the night, Mungyang Chaoba saw seven heavenly women descend from the sky. They removed their robes, placed them beside the pond, and entered the water. They bathed, played, laughed, and picked plants as before.

Mungyang Chaoba came forward and declared that none of them, whether human or divine, would go unpunished. The women could not leave the water because their clothes were on the bank and a man was watching them.

As sunrise approached, the celestial daughters pleaded with him. They explained that they must return to heaven before sunrise according to the rule of their heavenly father. They promised to grant him one wish in exchange for their freedom.

== Living with Arai Leima ==
Mungyang Chaoba asked for the most beautiful of the seven sisters to be his wife. The six elder sisters instructed the youngest sister, named Arai Leima, to stay with him until his death. They told her that a human lifetime was very short compared to a deity's lifespan.

Although reluctant, Arai Leima obeyed her elder sisters. The six sisters returned to heaven, while Arai Leima remained with Mungyang Chaoba.

=== Life in the garden ===
Because Arai Leima was a goddess, she could not live in a human village. Mungyang Chaoba built a house inside the garden, and they lived there together.

Over time, Mungyang Chaoba realized that living with a heavenly woman drained his strength. He feared that continuing life with her would cause his early death. He asked Arai Leima to forgive him and return to heaven, but she refused, as it violated the original agreement to stay until his natural death.

== Death ==
One night, while Arai Leima was asleep, Mungyang Chaoba secretly fled toward his village home.

Thangjing, the guardian god of the Moirang kingdom, witnessed this act. Thangjing caused Mungyang Chaoba to slip and die at the gate of his own village house.

== Rebirth and fulfillment of fate ==
God Thangjing informed Arai Leima that Mungyang Chaoba's death was not natural. Since the agreed conditions were not fulfilled, she could not return to heaven. She was told that Mungyang Chaoba would be reborn as a brave warrior of the Moirang kingdom named Puremba (also called Purenba), the son of Parenkoiba and grandson of Haoramyaima of the Khuman dynasty.

Arai Leima accepted her fate and waited. Mungyang Chaoba was reborn as Puremba, and they met again in that life. For him, it was rebirth; for her, it was only waiting, as she was a goddess.

== Later identity and legacy ==
In the Moirang kingdom, Arai Leima became known as Ngangkha Leima, meaning “Lady of Ngangkha,” because Puremba found her in the Ngangkha Lawai region.

With Puremba, she gave birth to a son named Khuman Khamba, who later became the hero of the classical Meitei romantic epic Khamba Thoibi, alongside Princess Thoibi of the Moirang kingdom.

== See also ==
- Hingchabi
- Helloi
