= List of rulers of Moirang =

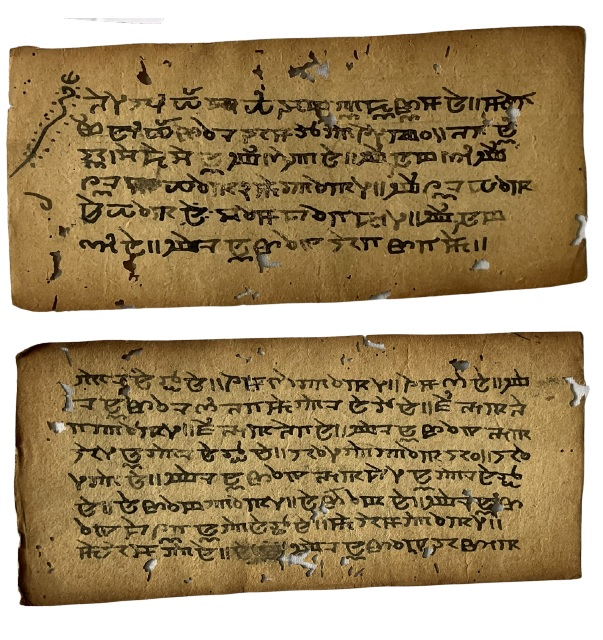
Moirang Ningthourol Yimtapa (alias Moilang Ningthoulol Yimtapa), an Ancient Meitei language manuscript text, in traditional Meetei Mayek script, about the kings of the Moirang kingdom

The genealogical order of the rulers of Ancient Moirang till the modern day Moirang, were recorded in many manuscripts including the Moirang Ningthourol Lambuba and other historical documents associated with the Moirang Kangleirol.

== Mythological rulers ==
Due to the lack of exact historical datings, the first recorded seven rulers, just before the rulers with dated reigns, were considered to be mythological rather than being historical.

- Ngangningshing
- Hamsha Thaba
- Phang Liklai
- Yoiba
- Narong
- Mayamba
- Sunucha

== Historical rulers ==
The recorded historical dates of the reigns of the rulers started from 52 BC when Emperor Phang Phang ascended the throne of Ancient Moirang kingdom.

Name of the rulers	Reign	Periods
Phang Phang Ponglen Hanba	80	52 BC- 28 AD
Telheiba	50	28 - 78
Lai Phacheng	52	78-130
Ura Ngangoiba (Ura Khundaba)	55	130-185
Sana Lakhwa	51	185-236
Laiyu Punshiba	61	236-297
Tusemba	40	297-337
Koting Ahanpa	50	337-387
Chothe Thangwai Pakhangba	60	387-447
Nungnang Tomba	49	447-496
Khokhei Lanthaba	37	496-533
Ura Khongyamba	41	533-574
Theeyang Meechaoba	60	574-614
Khokwa Nunghui Rang	48	614-662
Iwang Charanba	6	662-693
Thangga Ephen Lanthaba	41	693-739
Sangthong Khuba	45	739-784
Chingkhu Ura Telheiba	41	784-825
Mashemba	42	825-867
Koirenba	50	867-917
Kaba Purang	65	917-982
Ethai Kairemba	41	982-1023
Sangton Leinaota	31	1023-1054
Atellakki Loicha Ngamba	29	1054-1083
Chingkhu Telheiba	55	1083-1138
Laijing Punshiba	72	1138-1210
Khongjomba	53	1210-1263
Yoiremba	49	1263-1312
Punshi Khurenchanba	69	1312-1381
Sana Hongba	51	1381-1432

== Bibliography ==
- https://archive.org/details/in.ernet.dli.2015.465405
