= Khamnu =

Figure in Metei legend and folklore

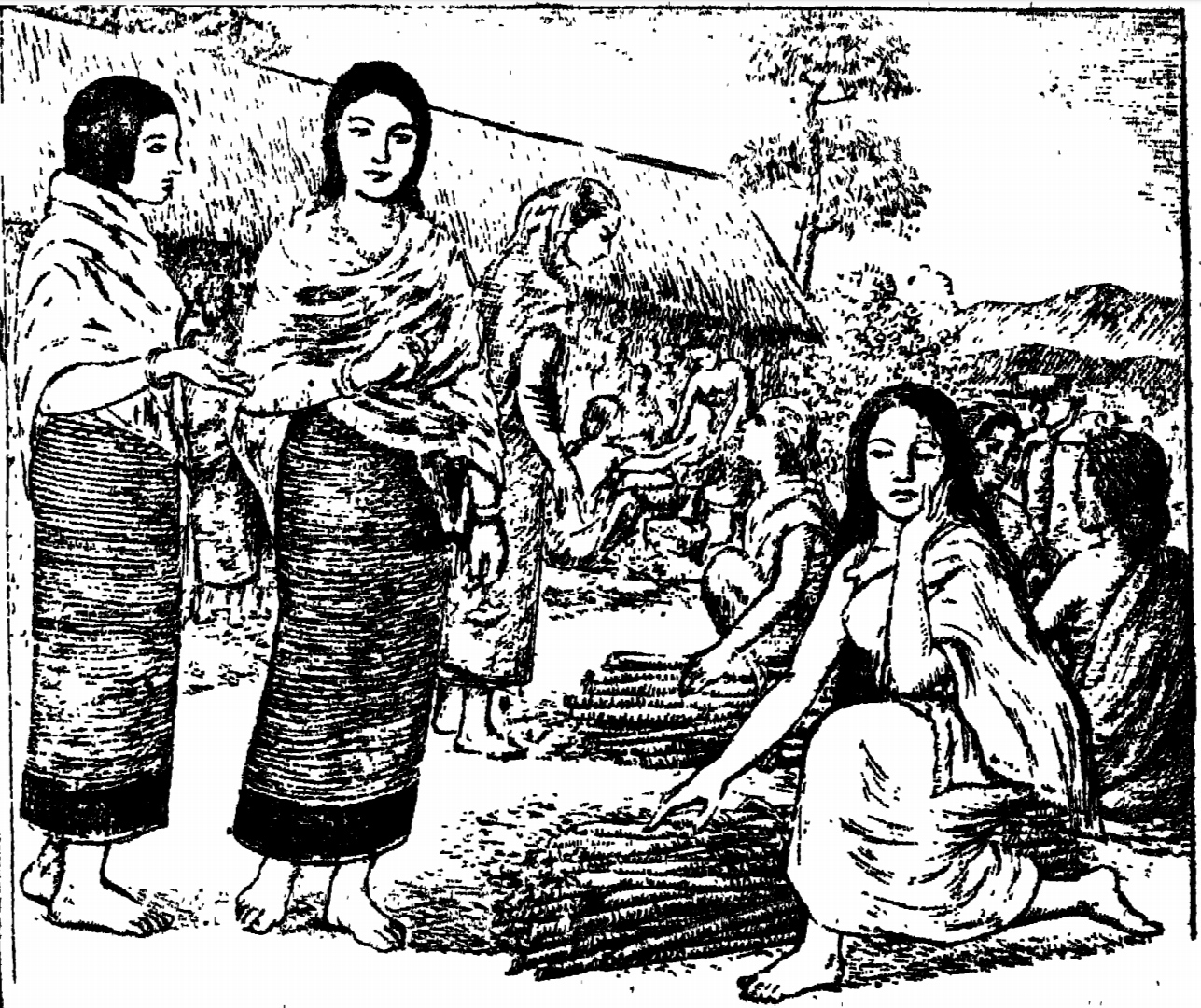
- Princess Thoibi and her chief maid Senu, coming to the market, where Khamnu sells woods.
- Born: Ancient Moirang
- Title: Real daughter of the king, foster daughter of the prime minister
- Spouse: Pheiroichamba (Pheiroijamba)
- Parents: King Chingkhu Telheiba (biological), Prime Minister Khuman Puremba (foster) (father); Ngangkha Leima (Ngangkhareima) (mother)
- Relatives: Khuman Khamba (younger brother), Moirang Thoibi (younger sister in law)
- Family: Moirang dynasty (biological), Khuman dynasty (foster)

Khamnu (/kʰəm.nu/) is a figure in Metei legend and folklore. She appears in the epic poem Khamba Thoibi. She is the daughter of prime minister Khuman Puremba of Ancient Moirang. Biologically, she is a daughter of King Chingkhu Telheiba of Ancient Moirang. She is the older sister of Khuman Khamba. She is best known for raising her younger brother when he was a child. The two siblings became orphans during their infancy. Khamnu feared evil plots, she took her younger brother and fled her home town. They took refuge in the village of the Kabui chief in the hills.

Khamnu and her younger brother Khamba were given fatherly care by General Thonglen and a nobleman called Chaoba Nongthonba before and after their time at the Kabui village in the hills.

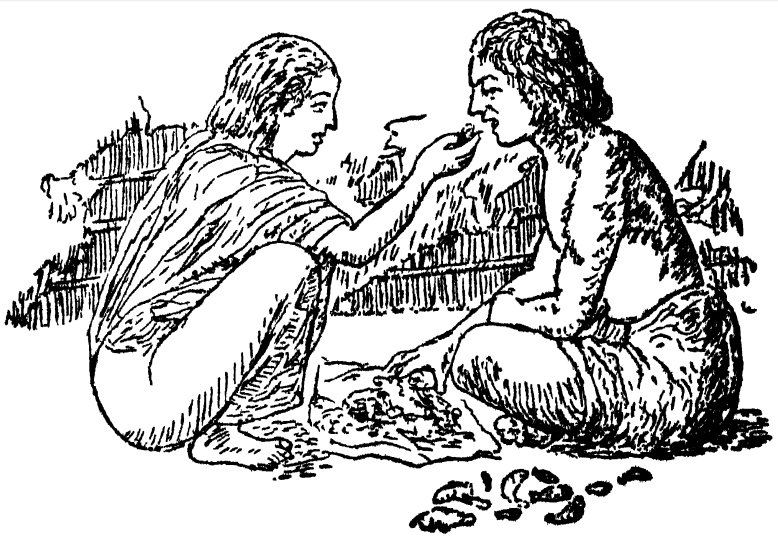
Khamnu feeding her younger brother, Khuman Khamba.

So she is often compared to Kunti of the Mahabharata because of the hard work she did to raise and care for Khuman Khamba.

== Early life ==
Khamnu's parents died when her brother Khuman Khamba was still a baby, and life became very difficult for them. Khamnu went from place to place seeking work in Moirang. She husked paddy for some people. The women who owned the paddy paid her by breastfeeding the infant Khamba. In this way, she worked until she and her brother were both adults. To earn a living, Khamnu sold wood in a market of Moirang. One day, Princess Thoibi visited the marketplace. She noticed Khamnu, a strange new face. She befriended Khamnu gave her food and jewelry. Thoibi asked Khamnu to come with her when she went fishing in Loktak lake. So Khamnu accompanied the princess on the pleasure trip.

Princess Thoibi visited Khamnu's house. Meanwhile, but Khamnu had gone out to the market. Thoibi gave her gifts to Khamnu's brother Khamba instead. The two fell in love and bound themselves by an oath before the God Khuman Pokpa. They drank the water in which a golden bracelet had been dipped and vowed to be lovers forever. After this oath, Thoibi addressed Khamnu as "sister".

== Revelation of identity ==
Khamnu's younger brother Khamba went out among other men. He joined the wrestling club. While wrestling, Khamba defeated Nongban. Nongban was the champion of all the wrestlers in the kingdom. At Nongban's defeat, Khamba's long-hidden identity as the son of the great warrior Khuman Purenba became common knowledge. At this, Minister Nongthonba remembered the marriage engagement between Feiroijamba, his firstborn son, and Khamnu and went to visit her. Khamnu hid herself in the women's chamber. They cried tears and were very sad. At this, Khamnu came out. She received the gifts from them. From this time onwards, Khamnu and her brother Khamba were always supported by Minister Nongthonba, Minister Thonglen and Feiroijamba in every way of life.

== Secret of the dangerous bull ==
Khamnu's younger brother Khuman Khamba was ordered to capture the Kao bull from the Khuman kingdom. Khamnu told her brother the secret of catching the Kao bull and gave him a special rope. She said,

"This great bull was once the Lord of your father's herd. Go to him, speak your father's name in his ear, and show him this rope of silk."

On the day of the adventure, Khamba did everything as his sister had told him to do. This tamed the bull.

== Marriage ==
Khamnu and Feiroijamba got married after the wedding of Khuman Khamba and Moirang Thoibi. Her engagement had been made by Nongtholba and late Purenba a long time earlier.

== Namesakes ==
=== Market ===
Khamnu Keithel (literally, "Khamnu market") was constructed at INR 9 crore (1.2 million US Dollar) under the project of Planning and Development Authority (PDA) in Moirang.

== Other websites ==
- Khamnu_archive.org
- Khamnu_e-pao.net
