= Keke Moirang =

Early kingdom in the southern Manipur

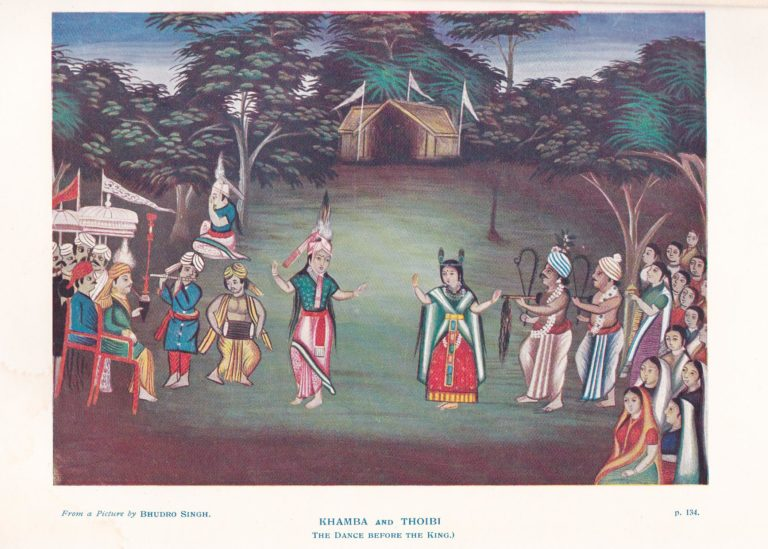
Khuman Khamba and Moirang Thoibi performing a devotional dance before the pantheon of Lord Ebudhou Thangjing Temple.

Keke Moirang, was an independent kingdom in the southern plains of the present day Manipur, India from 52 BCE to 1432 CE. The Keke Kangla served as the capital city of the kingdom since time immemorial. The major body of accounts related to the history, literature, mythology of the kingdom are collectively called Moirang Kangleirol.

== Government and Economy ==
=== Administration and Commerce ===
Moirang was ruled by an absolute monarch, the Iwang Puriklai. The kingdom was divided into wards or sectors (Meitei: leikheis) and included nine organized marketplaces.

== Culture ==
=== Religion ===
The people of Moirang worshipped Lord Thangching, the deity regarded as the progenitor of the kingdom.

== See also ==
- List of rulers of Moirang
- Moirang
- Iputhou Pakhangba Laishang
- Kangleipak
