= Samukhong (Khamba Thoibi) =

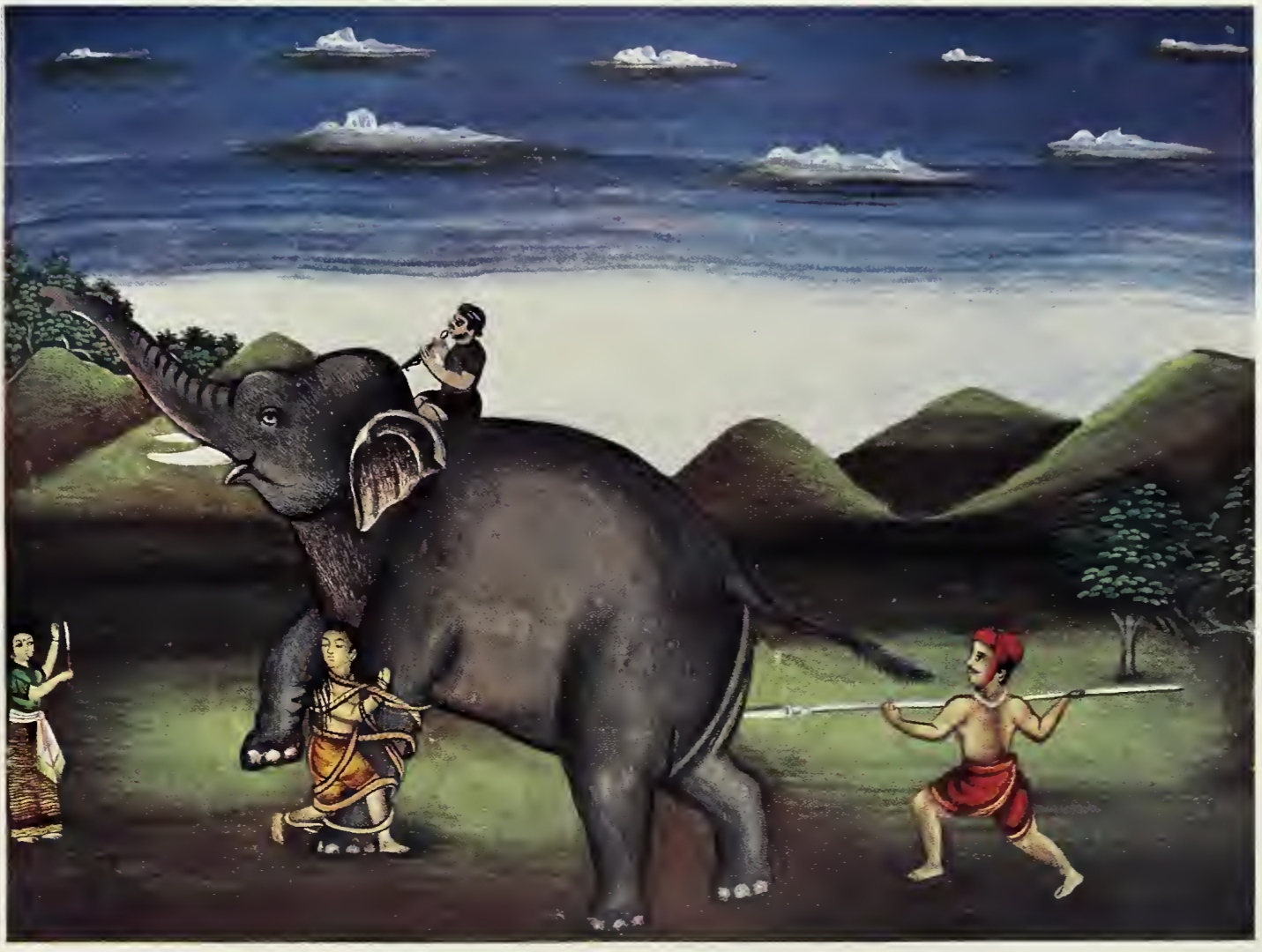
- Assassination attempt to kill Khuman Khamba using elephant
- Native name: ꯁꯃꯨ ꯈꯣꯡ
- English name: Torture by elephant/Assassination attempt to kill Khamba
- Time: midnight
- Location: Ancient Moirang
- Also known as: Shamukhong, Samu Khongyetpa, or Shamu Khongyetpa (ꯁꯥꯃꯨ ꯈꯣꯡꯌꯦꯠꯄ)
- Type: once
- Theme: conspiracy, murder attempt
- Cause: Ukai Kappa, Heijing (Khamba Thoibi)
- Motive: to have no other suitor of Princess Thoibi except Angom Nongban Kongyamba
- Target: to kill Khuman Khamba
- Perpetrator: Chingkhu Akhuba
- Patron: Chingkhu Akhuba
- Participants: Chingkhu Akhuba and Angom Nongban Kongyamba
- Outcome: injury to Khuman Khamba and punishment of the two criminals Chingkhu Akhuba and Angom Nongban Kongyamba
- Injuries: Khuman Khamba
- Inquiries: 2
- Arrests: 2
- Suspects: 2
- Accused: 2
- Convicted: 2
- Charges: 2
- Trial: happened at the Moirang Kangla royal court
- Verdict: to imprison Chingkhu Akhuba and Angom Nongban Kongyamba; to give medical treatment for Khuman Khamba
- Sentence: imprisonment of the criminals
- This incident led to the Kabo Loi (Khamba Thoibi).

Samukhong (ꯁꯃꯨ ꯈꯣꯡ), also spelled Shamukhong, Samu Khongyetpa, or Shamu Khongyetpa (ꯁꯥꯃꯨ ꯈꯣꯡꯌꯦꯠꯄ), is an event described in the Khamba Thoibi classical epic of the Moirang Kangleirol genre of Meitei mythology and folklore. It occurs as a consequence of the Ukai Kappa and Heijing incidents, when the crown prince Chingkhu Akhuba, and his ally, Angom Nongban Kongyamba, plotted assassination attempt against Khuman Khamba, using the royal elephant.

== Plot against Khamba ==
After the previous incidents, the crown prince and Kongyamba planned to kill Khamba. They sent fake messengers to call Khamba to the palace at midnight. On his way, Khamba was intercepted by Kongyamba and his men, who demanded that he give up thoughts and feelings for Princess Thoibi. Khamba refused, and a fight broke out.

During the fight, Khamba overpowered Kongyamba's men, threw them to the ground, and knelt on Kongyamba, pressing his throat. Khamba was close to killing Kongyamba, but Kongyamba's men dragged him away, beat him, tore his clothes, and bound him.

== Main incident ==
The crown prince arrived with a royal elephant. He ordered his men to beat Khamba further and tied him to the elephant's leg. The elephant driver, knowing Khamba was innocent, tied him loosely so he could breathe. They tried to make the elephant harm Khamba, but God Thangjing protected him. When Kongyamba struck the elephant with a spear, it moved in pain, but Khamba remained unharmed.

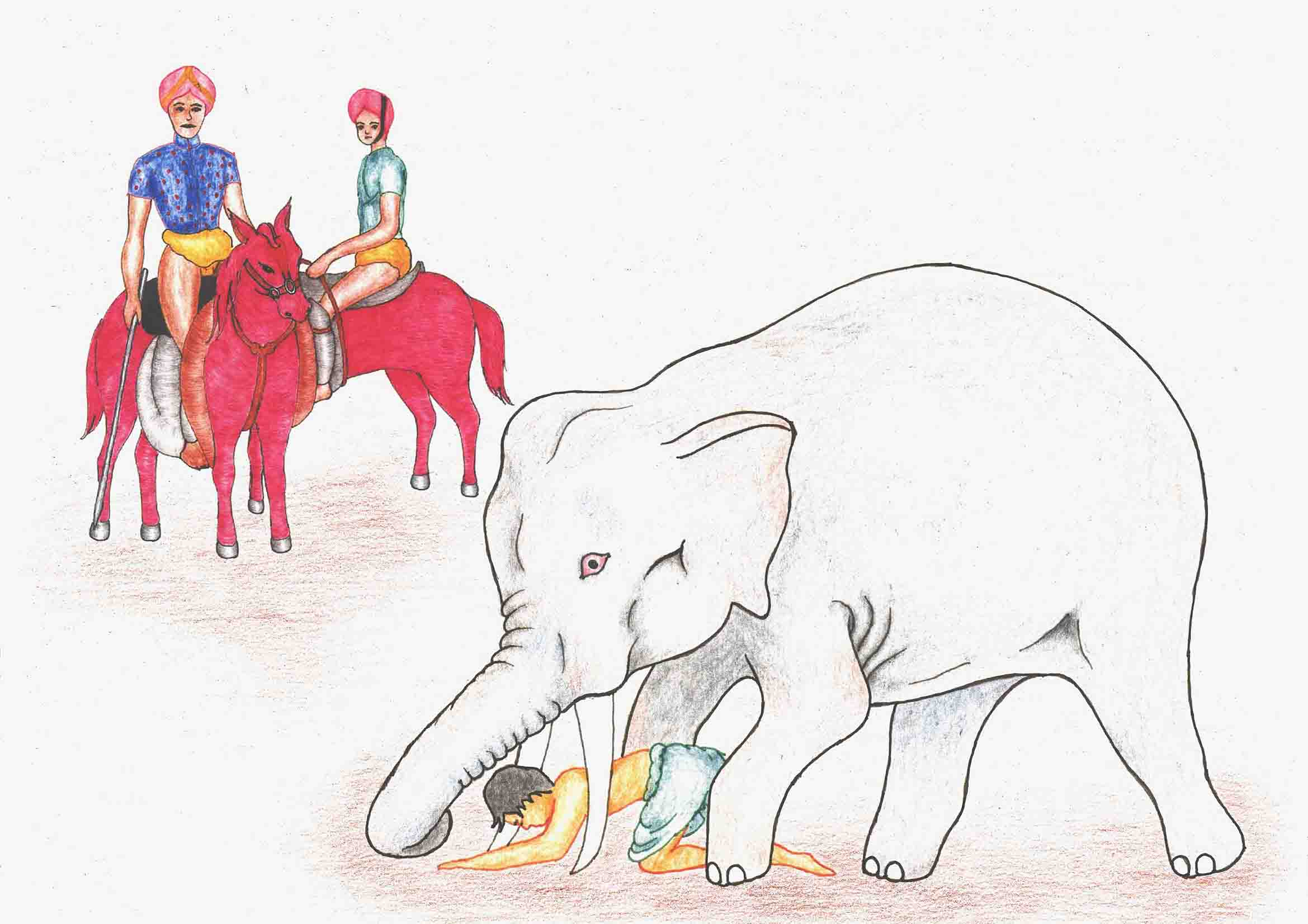
Khuman Khamba (The Torture by the Elephant)

== Rescue by Thoibi ==
That night, Goddess Panthoibi appeared in Princess Thoibi's dream and informed her that Khamba was bound to the elephant and in danger. Thoibi immediately took a sword and rushed to save him. The criminals fled, and Thoibi cut the ropes binding Khamba. She rubbed his limbs to restore blood flow and revive him.

Khamba's sister, Khamnu, learned about the incident and wept. Her fiancé, Pheiroijamba, came to help. Pheiroijamba's father, Chaoba Nongthonba, became angry at the crime and advised his son to bring the matter before the Royal Court.

== Court proceedings ==
Slaves of Minister Thonglen reported that Khamba was dead, which angered the minister. He went to the court with his army. Pheiroijamba pleaded three times about the harsh treatment of Khamba. The crown prince, proud and defiant, claimed responsibility and stated that Khamba was likely dead, refusing to take the complaint seriously.

Nongtholba challenged the prince, asking if he had the power of life and death. The prince claimed he did, but Nongtholba insisted that no one could harm his son-in-law while he was alive. The dispute escalated until both Minister Nongtholba and the crown prince went to King Chingkhu Telheiba.

== Resolution ==
Before their arrival, Princess Thoibi had informed the king about her father's crimes. Minister Thonglen arrived with his army, ready to fight, but Nongtholba calmed him. The king declared that the criminals would be punished. He imprisoned the crown prince and Angom Nongban Kongyamba until Khamba recovered.

Khamba received care and gifts from the king, and Princess Thoibi personally tended to him. After Khamba regained his health, the king released the crown prince, hoping he would no longer hold malice against Khamba.

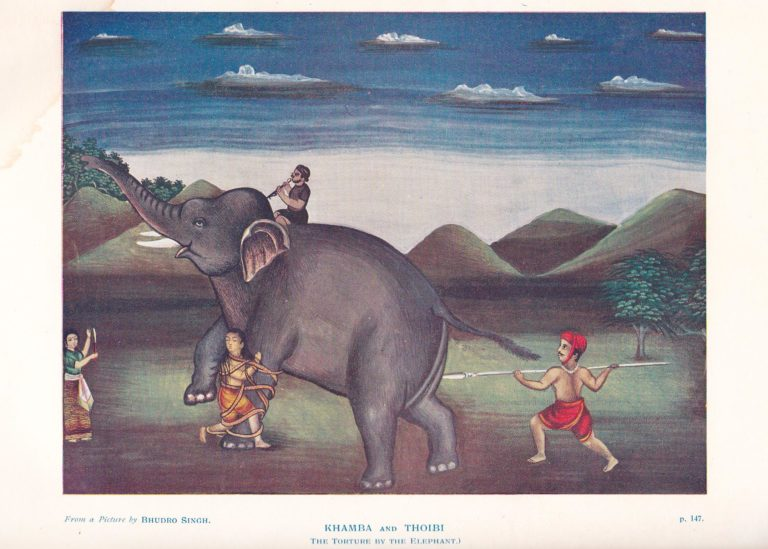
Khamba and Thoibi (The Torture by the Elephant)

== See also ==
- Shamu (Meitei culture)
