= Ukai Kappa =

- Ukai Kappa is an annual royal archery ceremony
- Native name: ꯎꯀꯥꯏ ꯀꯥꯞꯄ
- English name: Annual royal archery ritualistic ceremony
- Location: Ancient Moirang
- Also known as: Ukai Ten Kappa
- Type: annual
- Theme: a practice of traditional Meitei religion (Sanamahism)
- Motive: to get blessings from Thangjing, the national deity of Moirang
- Target: to shoot arrows at the targets set
- Patrons: Moirang royalty
- Organised by: Moirang royalty
- Participants: King Chingkhu Telheiba (served by Angom Nongban Kongyamba) and Crown Prince Chingkhu Akhuba (served by Khuman Khamba, but later by Angom Nongban Kongyamba)
- Outcome: Chingkhu Akhuba's anger and displeasure towards Khuman Khamba and sudden favor to Angom Nongban Kongyamba
- This incident resulted in Heijing (Khamba Thoibi).

Ukai Kappa (ꯎꯀꯥꯏ ꯀꯥꯞꯄ) is an annual royal archery ceremony, described in the Khamba Thoibi, a classical Meitei epic from the Moirang Kangleirol genre of Meitei mythology and folklore. The ritual is held for the welfare of Moirang kingdom and involves the king and his younger brother, the crown prince.

== Background ==
The event was traditionally held in honour of God Thangjing, the national deity of the Moirang kingdom. The king, Chingkhu Telheiba, and the crown prince, Chingkhu Akhuba, were the main archers. Their favourite task was to have their chosen attendants retrieve the arrows from the target as quickly as possible.

Angom Nongban Kongyamba was chosen to fetch the arrows shot by the king, while Khuman Khamba, a rival of Kongyamba, was chosen to fetch the arrows shot by the crown prince.

== Preparation ==
Before the event, the royal priests performed rituals, singing charms over the arrows and bows to bless them. The crown prince asked his daughter, Princess Thoibi, about the coat of golden embroidery she had recently prepared in her handloom. Thoibi, who had already given the coat to her lover Khamba, lied to her father about it.

== Main event ==
During the event, the king and the crown prince shot their arrows at the target. Kongyamba quickly retrieved the arrows for the king. Khamba ran swiftly to fetch the arrows for the crown prince. While running, Khamba's outer cloth loosened, revealing the golden embroidered coat underneath.

The crown prince became angry when he saw Khamba wearing the coat. When Khamba offered him an arrow, the prince refused to accept it and turned away. Kongyamba then took the arrow from Khamba and gave it to the crown prince. The prince was pleased with Kongyamba and promised that Princess Thoibi would marry him within five days.

== Conflict ==
Minister Chaoba Nongthonba questioned the crown prince about his sudden anger toward Khamba. The prince said he did not like Khamba and wanted to give Thoibi to Kongyamba. The minister reminded him that the king, Chingkhu Telheiba, had already promised Thoibi's hand to Khamba when Khamba captured a feral Kao (bull) from the Ikop Pat lake shore in the Khuman kingdom. The promise was marked publicly with seven notches on the lintel of the Moirang royal palace, the Moirang Kangla.

== Aftermath ==
The crown prince ignored the king's earlier promise and instructed his wives to prepare for the reception for wedding gifts from Kongyamba. Within five days, he intended to give his daughter Thoibi in marriage to Kongyamba.

== See also ==
- Meitei traditional weapons
- Meitei martial arts
