= Chingkhu Akhuba =

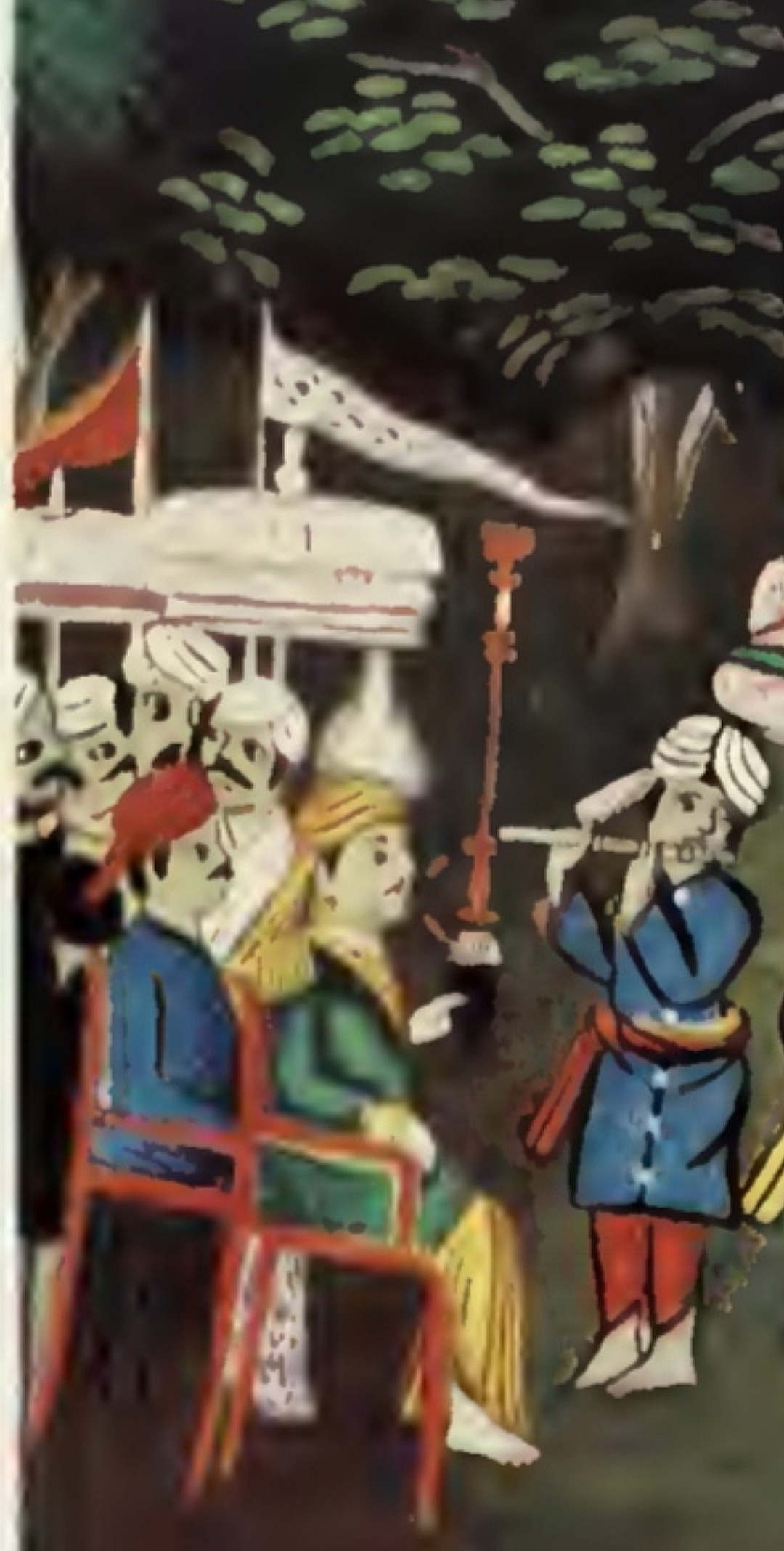
Chingkhu Akhuba and his elder brother, King Iwang Puriklai Chingkhu Telheiba, with their attendees

Wangol Ningthou Chingkhu Naha Akhuba (ꯋꯥꯡꯒꯣꯜ ꯅꯤꯡꯊꯧ ꯆꯤꯡꯈꯨ ꯅꯍꯥ ꯑꯈꯨꯕ), shortly known as Chingkhu Akhuba (ꯆꯤꯡꯈꯨ ꯑꯈꯨꯕꯥ), or Chingkhu Naha (ꯆꯤꯡꯈꯨ ꯅꯍꯥ), or sometimes in modern literature as Chingkhuba Jubaraj (ꯆꯤꯡꯈꯨꯕ ꯖꯨꯕꯔꯥꯖ), was a crown prince (Wangon Ningthou) (Note: also spelled as wangol ningthou) and royal brother in the Moirang dynasty of ancient Moirang kingdom. He was the younger brother of King Chingkhu Telheiba, who ruled from 1083 CE to 1138 CE. Both brothers are sometimes called Chingkhuba, which can cause confusion.

He was the father of Thoibi, the Iwanglon (or Ewanglon, meaning a princess of Moirang), who is the protagonist of the classical Meitei epic Khamba Thoibi. Chingkhu Akhuba played an important role in the Moirang Kangleirol tradition, which is part of Meitei mythology and folklore.

== Relationship with Khuman Khamba ==
=== First meeting with Khuman Khamba ===
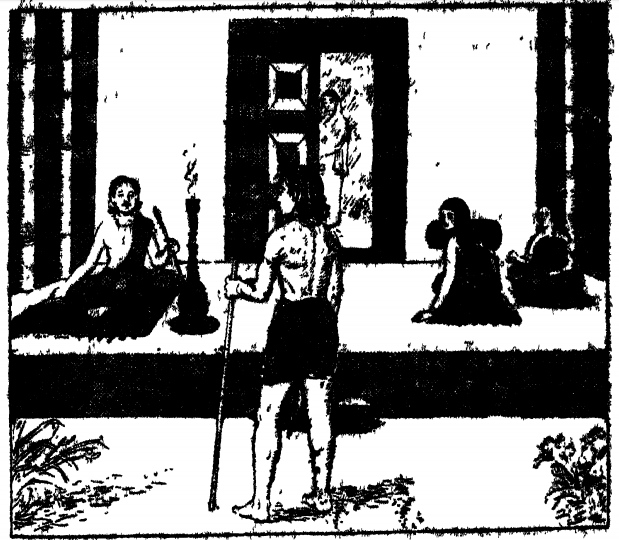
Crown Prince Chingkhu Akhuba and his daughter Thoibi meeting Khuman Khamba for the first time, when the latter sought to get a job.

Chingkhu Akhuba first met Khuman Khamba when Khamba came to request service from him. At that time, Chingkhu Akhuba was sitting in the verandah of his house, enjoying a hookah. He gave Khuman Khamba the task of grazing his wild bull, which was so fierce that no one else could handle it. This meeting was also the first time Princess Thoibi and Khuman Khamba saw each other. Because of Khuman Khamba’s daily service, Chingkhu Akhuba developed a good impression, felt pity, and had a soft corner for him.

=== Changing of attitude towards Khuman Khamba ===
Initially, Chingkhu Akhuba was kind towards Khuman Khamba, the hero of the Khamba Thoibi epic and the lover of his daughter Thoibi.

However, during the Ukai Kappa, a royal annual archery ritual, Chingkhu Akhuba lost favor with Khuman Khamba. He then supported Angom Nongban Kongyamba, a rival suitor of Thoibi, whom Thoibi did not like.

=== Attempts to separate Thoibi and Khamba ===
Chingkhu Akhuba repeatedly tried to separate his daughter from Khuman Khamba and marry her to Angom Nongban Kongyamba. Thoibi successfully avoided these attempts with help from her uncle, King Chingkhu Telheiba, and the divine intervention of God Thangjing, the national deity of Moirang.

He also planned an assassination attempt on Khuman Khamba using the royal elephant at night, together with Angom Nongban Kongyamba. Khamba was badly injured, but Thoibi learned about the attack in a dream and foiled the plan.

== Imprisonment and bail ==
Because of his actions in the assassination attempt to kill Khuman Khamba, Chingkhu Akhuba and Angom Nongban Kongyamba were jailed by King Chingkhu Telheiba. Complaints came from ministers Thonglen and Chaoba Nongthon, a man named Pheiroijamba, and Princess Thoibi. Chingkhu Akhuba was later bailed after Khuman Khamba recovered from his injuries.

== Exiling his own daughter ==
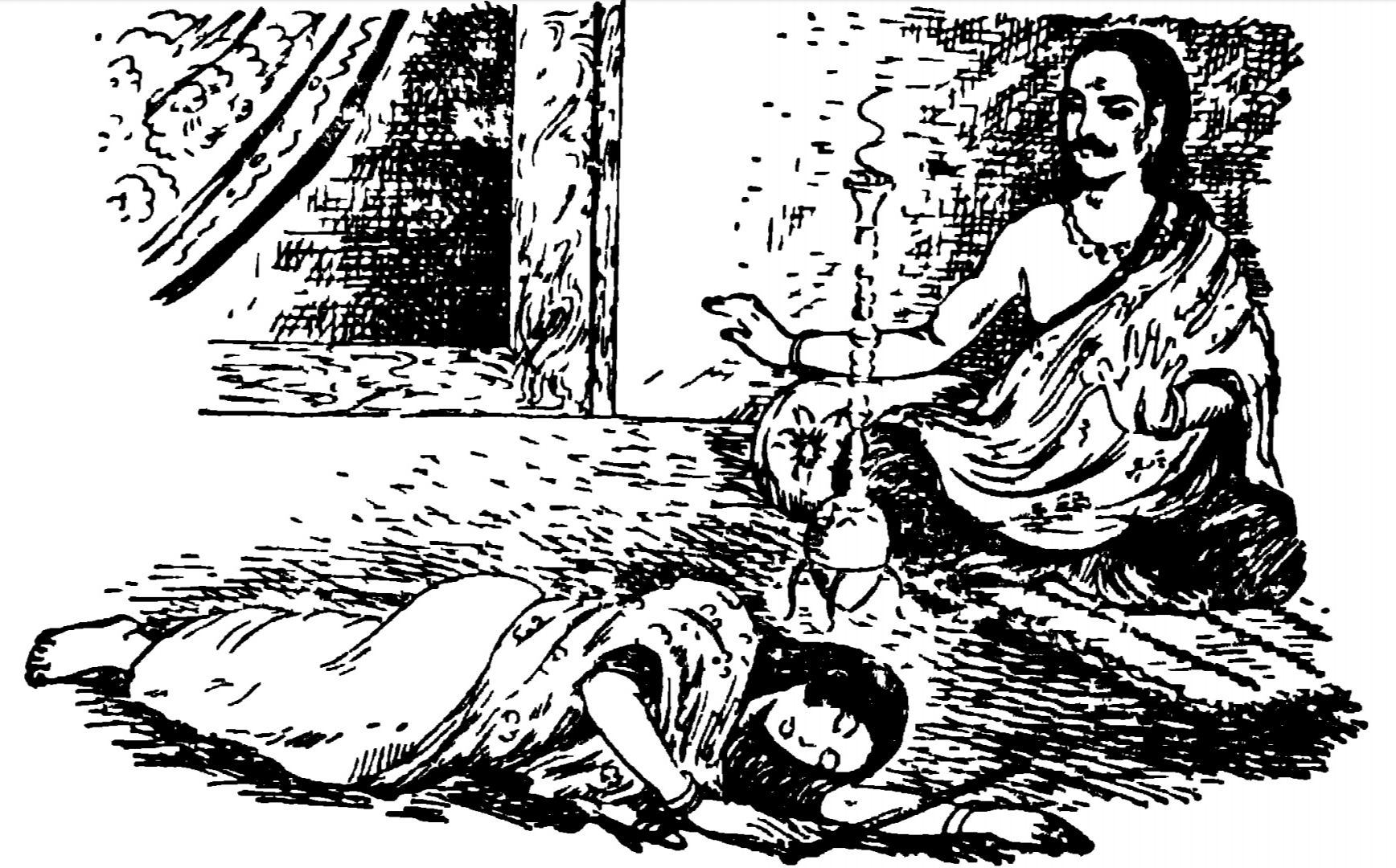
Princess Thoibi being beaten by her father Chingkhuba (Chingkhu Akhuba)

Angered at his daughter, Chingkhu Akhuba exiled Thoibi to the Kabo (Kabaw) region, a tributary province of Moirang. He intended her to suffer there. In Kabo, Thoibi faced harsh treatment from Changning, the daughter of Chief Tamurakpa, although the chief did not harm her.

Later, Chingkhu Akhuba summoned Thoibi back to Moirang but secretly planned to have Angom Nongban Kongyamba abduct her for marriage. Thoibi avoided the plot with her wisdom and successfully reached Khuman Khamba’s house.

=== Marriage of Thoibi and Khuman Khamba ===
The dispute reached the royal court. The king decided that the person who killed the tiger of Khoirentak region would marry Princess Thoibi. Angom Nongban Kongyamba died in the hunt, while Khuman Khamba killed the tiger.

With no options left, Chingkhu Akhuba reluctantly and angrily gave his daughter in marriage to Khuman Khamba.

== See also ==
- List of rulers of Moirang
