= Chingkhuba =

Chingkhuba may refer to:

- Chingkhu Telheiba, the king of ancient Moirang kingdom, who ruled from 1083 CE to 1138 CE
- Chingkhu Akhuba, a crown prince and younger brother of the Moirang King Chingkhu Telheiba.
