= Thoibi =

Thoibi (Old Manipuri: Thoipi)
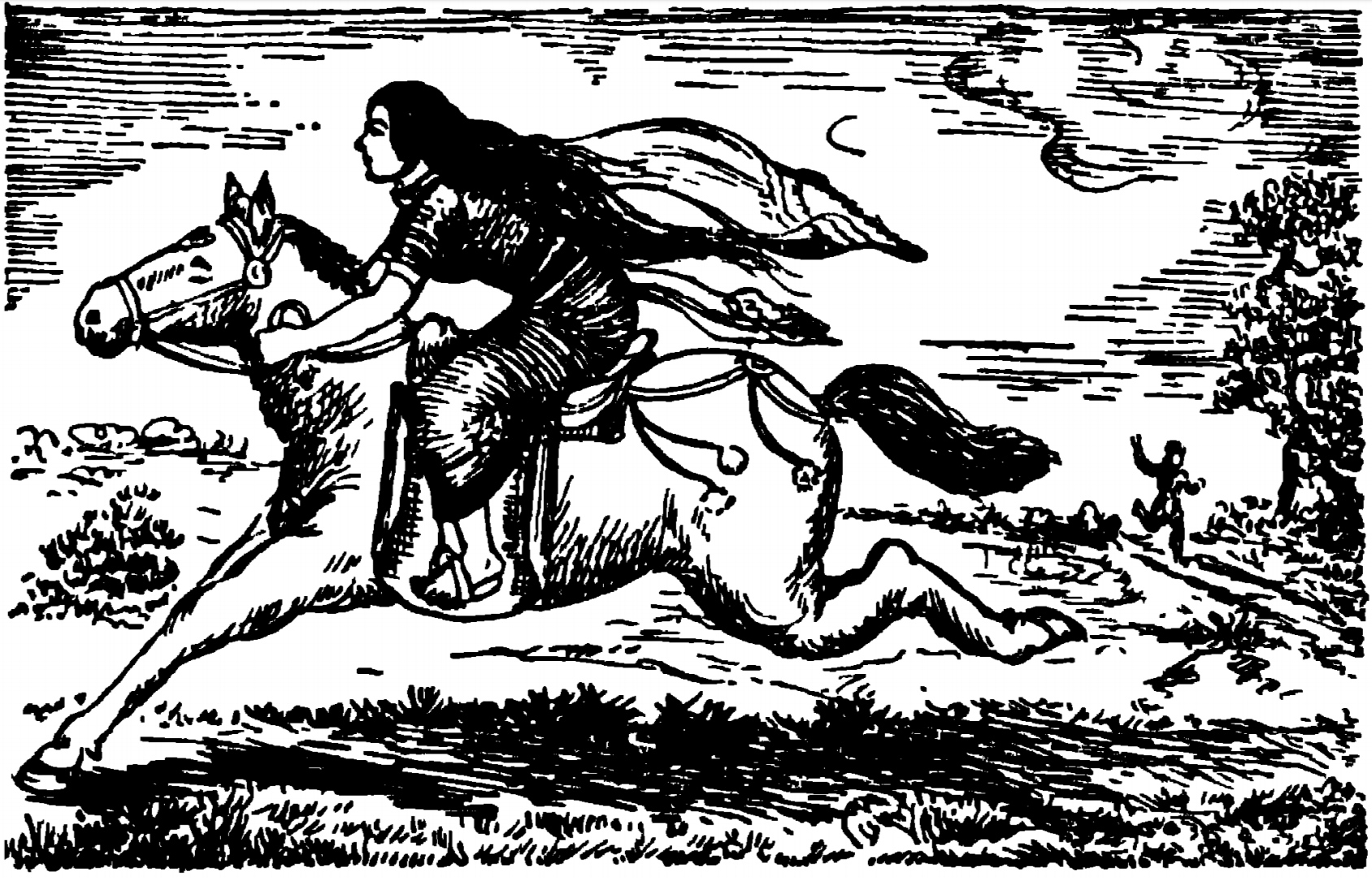
- Princess Thoibi tricked Angom Nongban Kongyamba and escaped from him

In-universe information
- Aliases: Moirang Thoibi; Moilang Thoipi; Ewanglon Thoibi; Iwanglon Thoibi
- Gender: Female
- Title: Langlen Thadoi
- Occupation: Princess of the Moirang kingdom
- Affiliation: Khamba Thoibi, Moirang Saiyon, Moirang Kangleirol, Meitei mythology, Meitei folklore, History of Manipur
- Family: Moirang Royal Family
- Spouse: Khuman Khamba
- Relatives: Chingkhu Akhuba, Chingkhu Telheiba
- Religion: Meitei religion (Sanamahism)
- Origin: Moirang kingdomR

Moirang Thoibi (Old Manipuri: Moilang Thoipi) or Ewanglon Thoibi (Old Manipuri: Ewanglon Thoipi) is the main character of the Khamba Thoibi story from ancient Moirang Kangleirol legends. She is a princess of the Ancient Moirang kingdom. She is not the king's daughter. Rather, she is the daughter of the King's younger brother Chingkhu Akhuba and therefore the fraternal niece of King Chingkhu Telheiba of Moirang. Khuman Khamba, a poor orphan prince, fell in love with Thoibi.

The word "Thoibi" means "perfection" or "completion of beauty and accomplishments."

== Early life ==
=== Meeting Khamnu ===
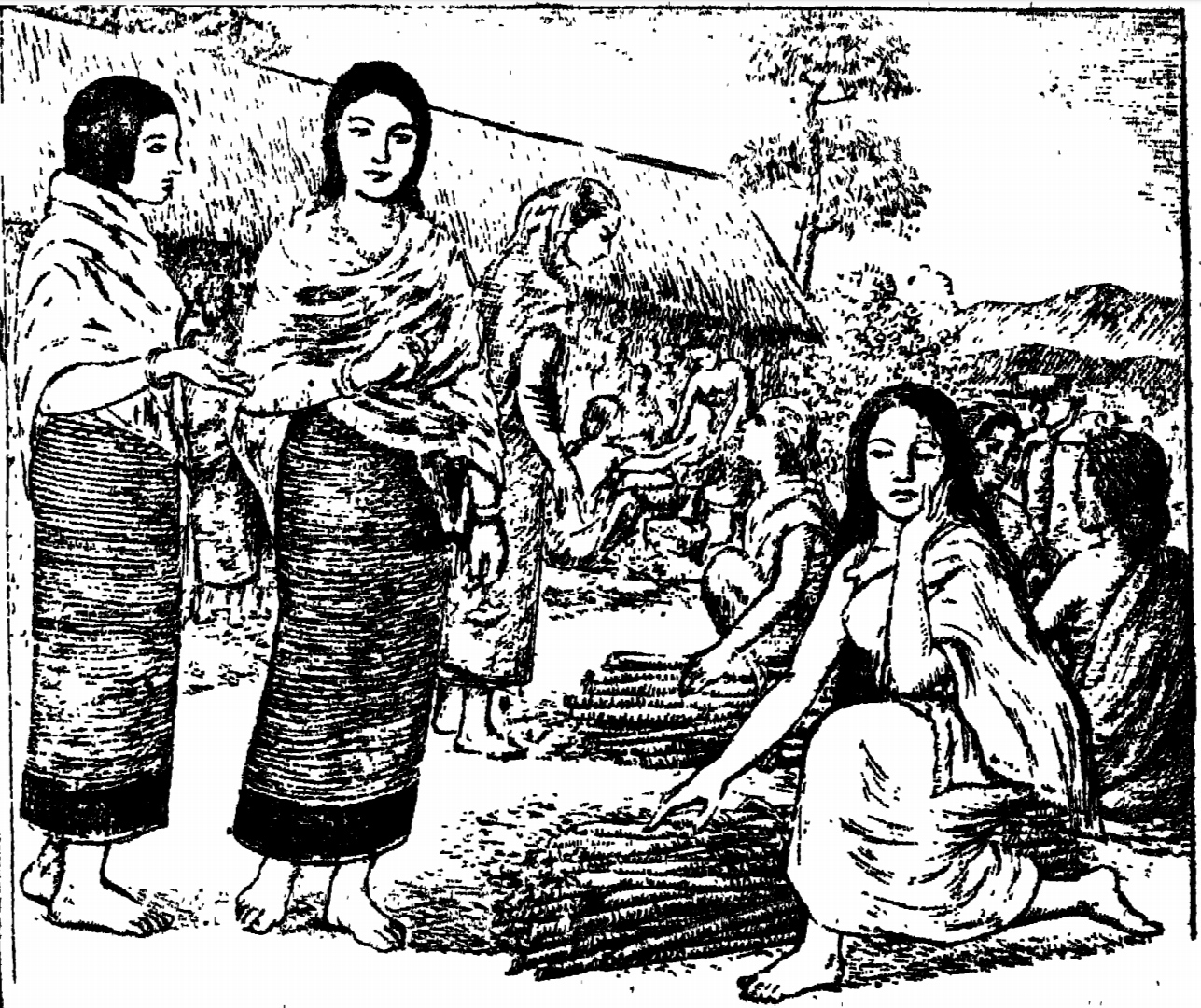
Princess Thoibi meeting Khamnu in a marketplace.

One day, Princess Thoibi visited the marketplace of Moirang. She saw a girl named Khamnu selling wood and befriended her, giving her food and jewelry. The next time Thoibi went to the market, she met Khamnu again and invited her on a fishing outing on Loktak lake with her other companions. When the king heard that the princess and her friends were going fishing on the lake, he ordered all the men in the kingdom to stay away from the lake. Khamnu told her brother Khamba about this the royal order. The next day, she left him at home.

=== Meeting Khamba ===
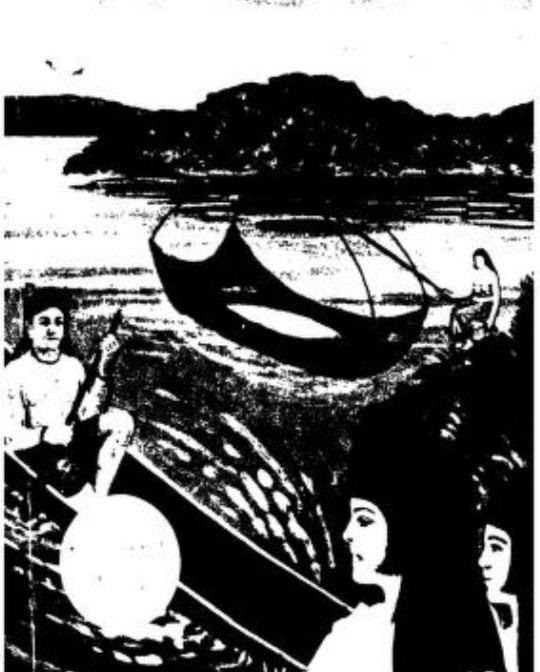
Thoibi saw Khamba sailing on a boat in the Loktak lake.

That night, Khamba had a dream. In that dream, the goddess Ayangleima (either Panthoibi or Koiren Leima) came to him in the form of Khamnu and asked him to get vegetables. Khamba woke up and wondered about his dream. The god Thangjing made him believe that he had truly seen his sister Khamnu in waking life. So he rowed down the lake in a rowboat. But he went in the wrong direction. Thangjing spread clouds over the hills, and there was a storm, which blew Khamba's boat towards Thoibi and her friends on their fishing trip. Thoibi saw Khamba standing close to her. She asked Khamnu if she knew the strange man disobeying the royal order. Khamnu said no. Khamba did not know what to do. Hearing his sister's voice, he went closer. Thoibi saw that Khamba was handsome, manly, muscular, and well fashioned. Khamba was also amazed at Thoibi's beauty and glamour. According to the story, it was god's will that they should be lovers. Khamnu worried that her brother might be punished for disobedience. Thoibi noticed a piece of cloth in Khamnu's clothing matched Khamba's headdress. She also saw Khamba wearing a bracelet that she had given to Khamnu. Later, Khamnu admitted that she was related to Khamba. Thoibi became kind to Khamba. She gave him good food. She told him to go home before the king heard that he had broken his edict that no men come to the lake.

== Oath to her lover ==
Princess Thoibi visited Khamnu's house. Thoibi sat on a red cloth near the post on the north side (ukoklel). The walls of the old house were full of holes. So Khamba hid himself within a mat. Thoibi asked Khamnu about the mat. Khamnu said that it was the place of worship of the god Khuman Pokpa. So Thoibi asked if she could pray to the god. She wanted his blessing. Thoibi knew very well that Khamba was hiding there, but she pretended that she did not. She prayed out loud to the god to allow her to worship him daily in the house. Khamba heard her voice. He laughed aloud. Thoibi said the God was speaking. She came out in the veranda. Meanwhile, Khamba sent his sister to the market to get some fruit. At Khamnu's absence, Thoibi presented Khamba with gifts. The two bound themselves by an oath before the god Khuman Pokpa. They drank water in which a golden bracelet had been dipped. They vowed to be lovers forever. After this oath, Thoibi addressed Khamnu as "sister".

== Legendary dance ==
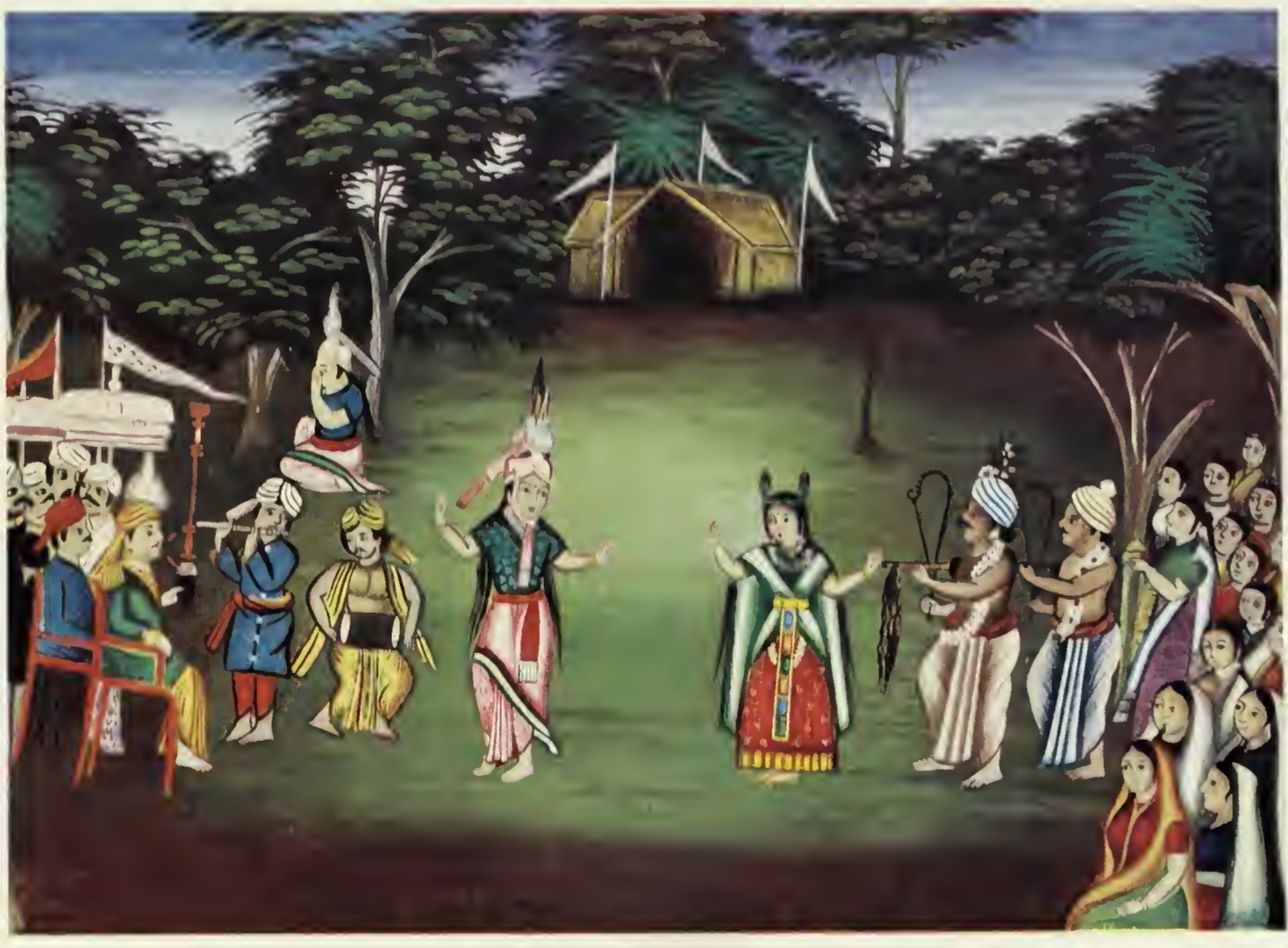
Khuman Khamba and Moirang Thoibi dancing the Khamba Thoibi Jagoi at the Ebudhou Thangjing Temple at the Lai Haraoba festival in Ancient Moirang.

The King named Khamba the Khuntak Leiroi Hanjaba (Floriculture Minister). It was his duty to gather flowers from the hills. Thoibi prepared delicious food for Khamba to take with him. She tied the food in a bundle of leaves. She fastened it with silks of seven kinds. By the grace of Thangjing, not a petal of a single flower brought by Khamba was broken. At Khamba's return, Thoibi washed his feet and offered him fruit.On the day of customary rituals to be performed, Khamba first offered his flowers to Thangjing. After that, Khamba gave the flowers to the king, to the queen, and then to the high officers of Moirang. Everyone was happy with the flowers. They gave Khamba gifts. Khamba and Thoibi danced before Thangjing's holy shrine. The people watching shouted with joy during the dance. Finally, Khamba and Thoibi knelt before Thangjing.

== Exile ==
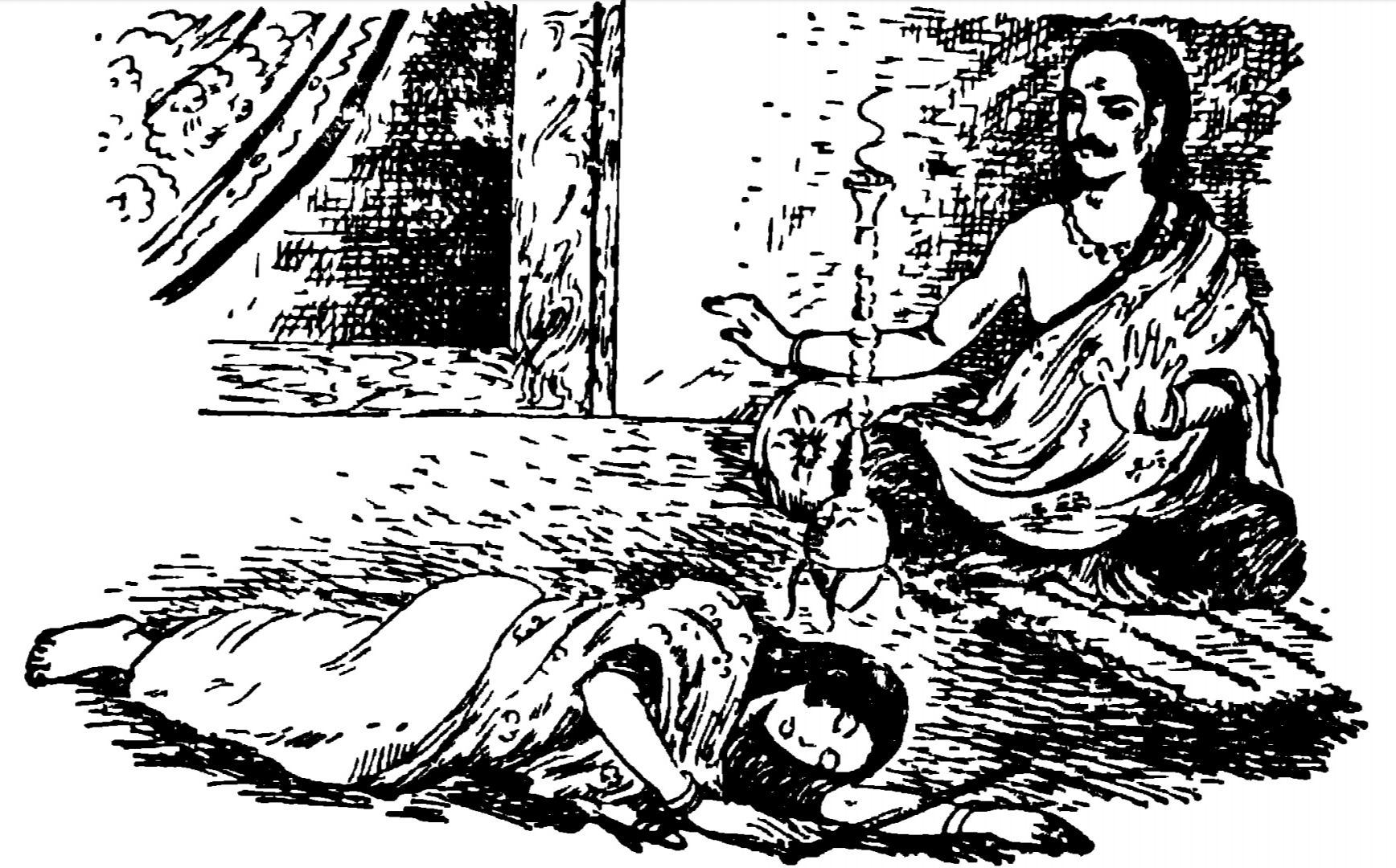
Thoibi being beaten by her father for not obeying him

Thoibi's father asked her to marry Nongban Kongyamba. She said no. Her father was angry and he said, "I will be better to be childless than be the father of this evil girl." He asked his minister, Hanjaba, to sell Thoibi to the Kabaw chief for silver and gold. He exiled her to the Kabaw chiefdom. He did not want to see her any more. Thoibi told Khamba about what happened. For his sake, she had to go exile to Kabaw. She told Khamba not to forget her. On the day of her exile, she cried so hard that she sounded like thunder. The queen and all her maids also wept. Minister Hanjaba took her away to Kabaw. On the way, she met Khamba. He wept with her, remembering the past happy days. Both the lovers felt the pain of separation. Khamba gave Thoibi a staff to lean on as she walked. On her way, Thoibi planted the staff by the roadside. She wished for it to grow flowers and become a living, leafy tree if she remained faithful to Khamba. She also marked a roadside stone. Finally, she reached Kabaw. But Chief Tamurakpa of Kabaw felt sorry for Thoibi. He kept her as a guest. Thoibi became a friend of the chief's daughter, Changning Kanbi. But the evil women of Kabaw persuaded Changning to treat Thoibi like a servant. Thoibi was sent to catch fish and to gather firewood. Thoibi was busy with her work. However, she always dreamed that Khamba was with her. Thangjing took pity on her. Chief Tamurakpa heard about the harsh treatment Thoibi had received from his daughter, so he asked all the women to weave one cloth each. Changning called Thoibi a wayward child because of Thoibi had not wanted to marry Kongyamba. Changning knew Kongyamba was muscular, attractive, and the son of famous ancestors. She considered Kongyamba a good man. Tamurakpa heard his daughter's words, and he was angry with her. He was about to strike her but Thoibi stopped him. The two ladies wove their cloth. Changning was jealous of Thoibi. In the night, Changning tore holes in Thoibi's cloth with a porcupine quill. Later, Thoibi saw what she had done. However, she repaired all the holes and made the cloth even more beautiful than before. Tamurakpa liked Thoibi's cloth very much. He threw his own daughter's cloth away. One day, when Thoibi was working at her loom, a wind blew ashes towards her. She knew the wind came from Moirang. She wept, remembering her beloved Khamba and her hometown. Thangjing softened her father's heart. He sent men to bring her back. However, one of them was Kongyamba, whom he asked to marry Thoibi on her way home. Thoibi prayed to the patron deity of the Kabaw chiefdom. She thanked Chief Tamurakpa for his kindness. On her way, she saw the stone on which she had written her promise to be faithful to Khamba. She prayed to it and offered gold and silver on it. She saw Khamba's staff which she had planted. It had grown flowers and become a living, leafy tree.

== Escape from Kongyamba ==
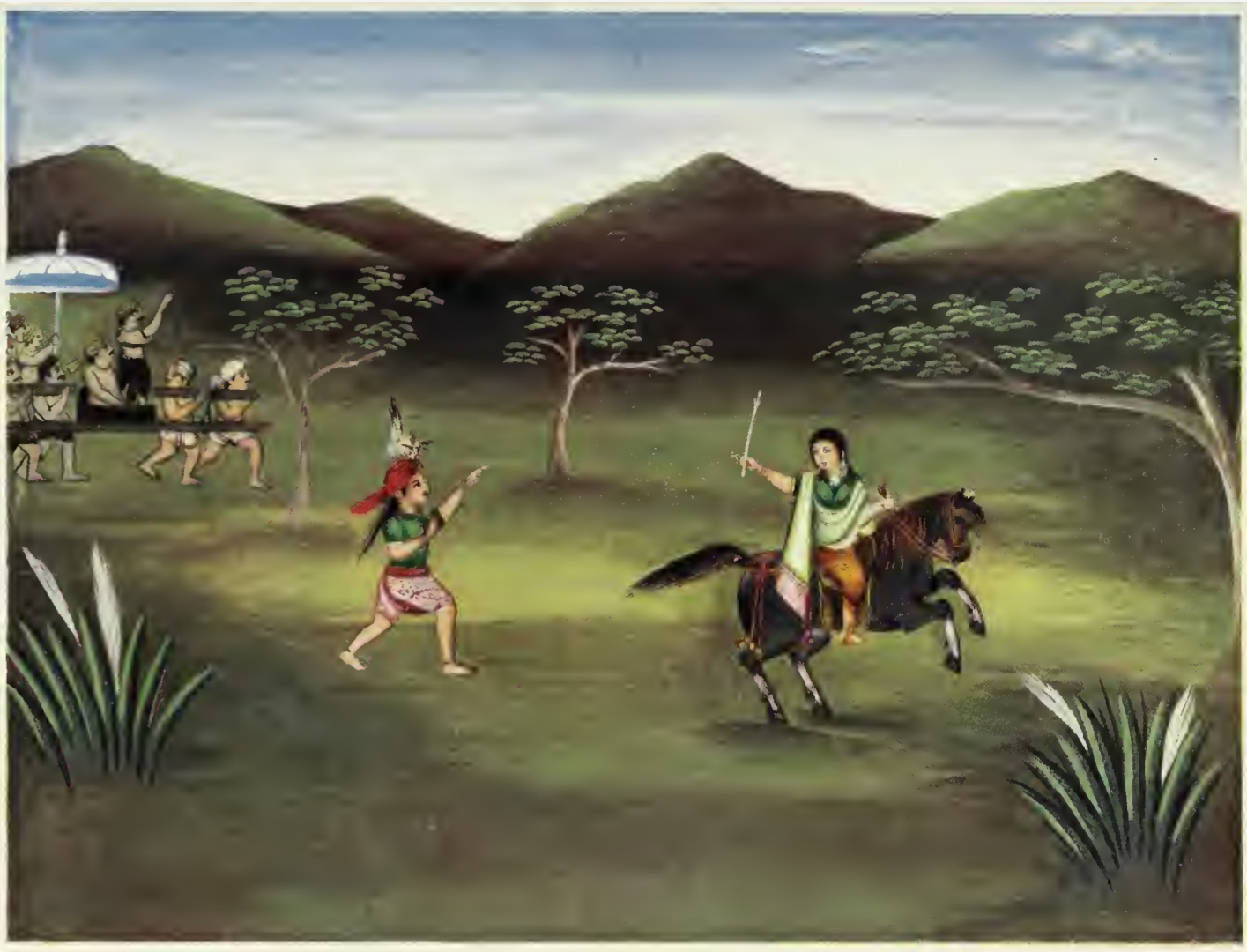
Thoibi escaped from Angom Nongban Kongyamba by tricking him

When Thoibi was on her way back home, she was awaited by her suitor, Angom Nongban Kongyamba. Angom Nongban Kongyamba asked his watchmen if Princess Thoibi was coming. After looking carefully, they shouted, "Lo, the Princess is at band." Thoibi heard the shout. She instructed her companions to sit near her if the man was Khamba but far away if the man was Kongyamba. It was Kongyamba and not Khamba. However, she went on. She pretended to be friendly to him. She sat on the red carpet of Kongyamba's possession. However, she placed a stick between Kongyamba and herself. She asked him for fruit to eat. Kongyamba brought her fruit. But she did not eat the fruit. She pretended to get ill due to her long journey from Kabaw. Kongyamba was worried. She asked Kongyamba to let her ride on his horse. He agreed. So Thoibi rode Kongyamba's horse. Kongyamba rode in Thoibi's palanquin. Suddenly, Thoibi galloped off on the horse towards Khamba's house. Khamba met her from the long time exile at his house. They wept for their reunion. Kongyamba was angry that he had been tricked by a girl. He asked the king's ministers to act. Minister Thonglen and Minister Nongtholba sent men to protect Khamba and Thoibi from their enemies. The matter was set before the king in the royal court. The king wanted to solve the issue by the trial of the spear. During the talk, an old man came to the meet the king. The old man told him that a ferocious tiger was a great threat to the villagers in a place called Khoirentak. The king changed his mind. He said he would use the tiger to decide what to do. He said that person who killed the tiger could marry Princess Thoibi.

== Marriage and death ==
Khamba killed the man-eating tiger. Khamba and Thoibi married each other in high state by the King of Moirang. One day, Khamba wondered if Thoibi was faithful to him. He wanted to test her chastity. One night, he pretended to travel away from home, but he secretly returned early. Disguised as a stranger, he pushed a stick through the wall of Thoibi's room. He was teasing Thoibi. Thoibi was not aware of all this. So, she thought it had been done by a stranger. She got angry. She pushed a spear through the wall to hit the stranger. Khamba was severely wounded. He called her. Thoibi knew his voice. She immediately went out and carried him inside. Khamba was dying. She was extremely shocked. Before he died, she killed herself upon him with the same spear. Khamba and Thoibi are the incarnations of a god and a goddess. According to the epic, they were sent by the god Thangjing. Unlike normal mortal beings, the god Thangjing denied them the happiness of a long life and children.

== In popular culture ==
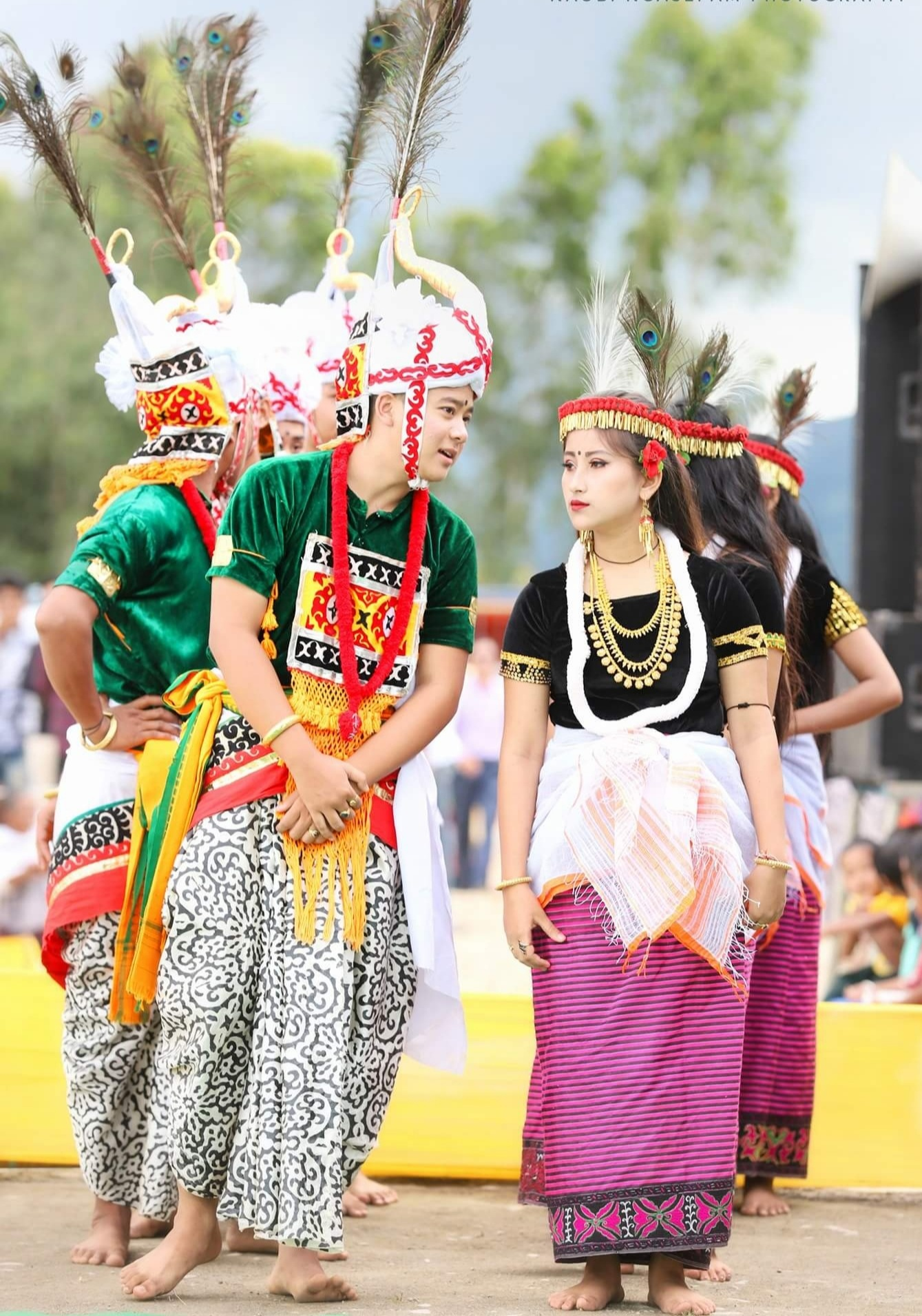
Dancers performing the Khamba Thoibi Jagoi in Manipur.

- The celebrated folk dance, Khamba Thoibi Jagoi, was first performed by Khuman Khamba and his lady love Thoibi in the premises of the Ebudhou Thangjing Temple. It's now a popular form of folk dance in Manipur.
- Moirang Thoibi, a literary work, composed by A. Dorendrajit, was one of the author's first three books.
- Moirang Thoibi is a protagonist in the celebrated epic poem Khamba Thoibi.
