= Nongban =

Angom Nongban Kongyamba
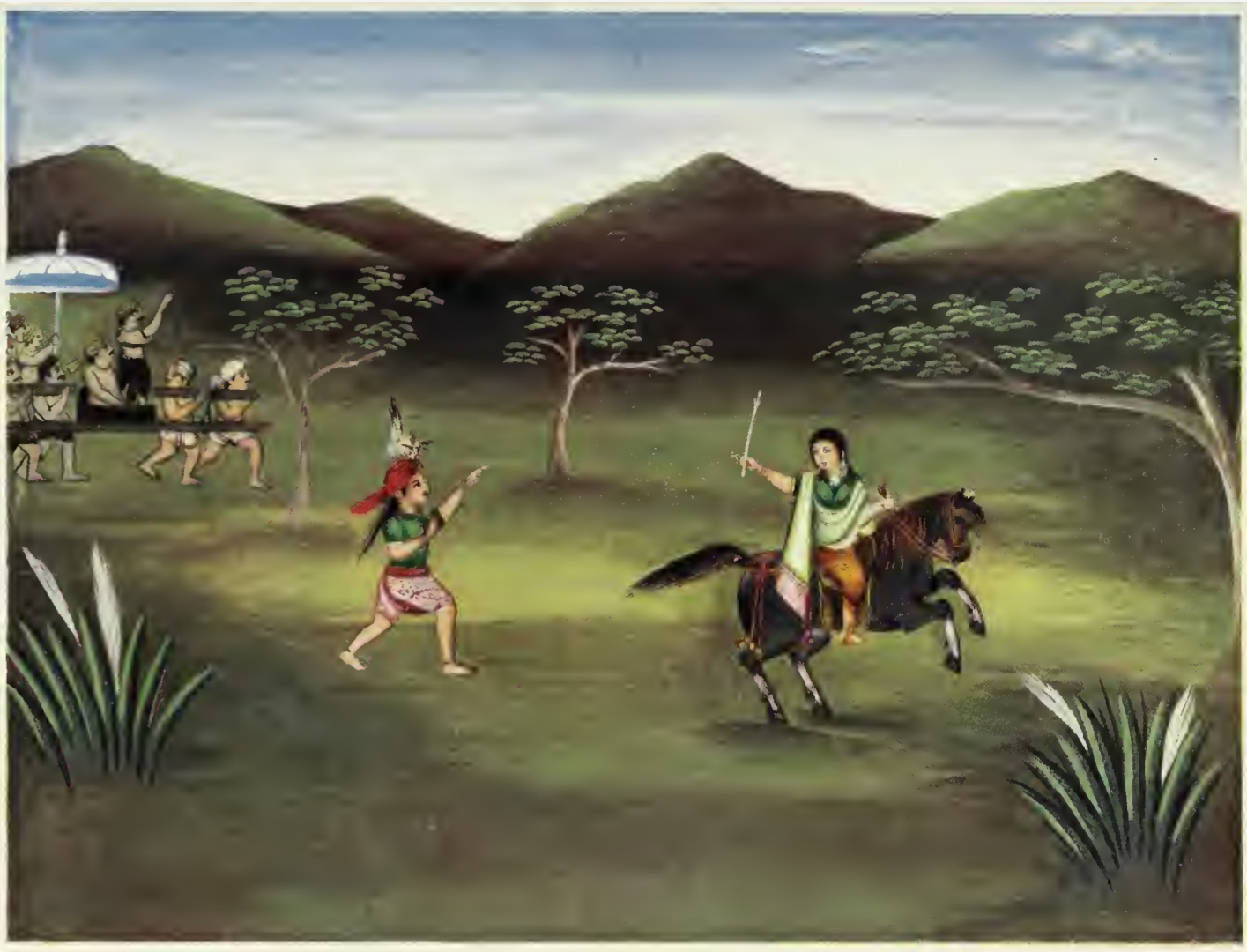
- A contemporary Meitei painting depicting Nongban, being tricked by Princess Thoibi.
- Died: Khoirentak
- Cause of death: Killed by the man-eating tiger of Khoirentak during the hunt
- Other names: Nongban, Angom Nongban, Nongban Kongyamba
- Occupation: Nobleman
- Era: Ancient Moirang
- Known for: Villain character of the Khamba Thoibi epic
- Title: Pee Thadoi
- Opponent: Khuman Khamba
- Spouse: 7 wives
- Family: Angom clan

Angom Nongban Kongyamba, known by just one name as Nongban, is a nobleman in Ancient Moirang. He is a rich man of Angom clan. He is the main villain in the Khamba Thoibi epic legend. He was a polygamist. He wanted to marry Princess Thoibi in addition to his other wives. Prince Chingkhuba, Thoibi's father, agreed to give him the princess' hand in marriage. However, Thoibi was in love with Khuman Khamba. So, he and Chingkhuba thought of many ways to stop Khuman Khamba. But none of their plans worked.

== Challenges to Khamba ==
Nongban was jealous of Khuman Khamba and wanted to show he was better than Khamba was. So he challenged Khamba many times.

=== Wrestling with Khamba and the breaking of Nongban's record ===
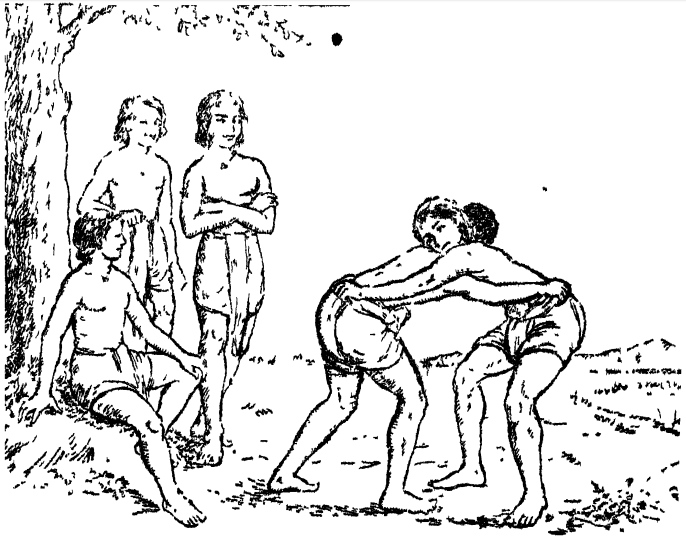
Khamba wrestling with his opponent Nongban

Nongban was the champion of Ancient Moirang kingdom in every field. No one could defeat him in wrestling, hockey and racing. He invited Khuman Khamba to wrestle with him. To everyone's surprise, Nongban was defeated by Khamba. From that time onwards, Nongban Kongyamba was jealous of Khuman Khamba.

=== The gathering of flowers for God ===
Once Nongban and Khamba went on to gather flowers. The flowers were to be offered to God Thangjing. They went to the hills. They reached a place where some flowers grew. At this, Kongyamba claimed the place as his father's place. He told Khamba the king's would be angry. Khamba did not know that it was a trick. Khamba asked about his father's place to gather flowers. Kongyamba randomly pointed to the southern hills. Khamba went there but found no flowers. So, he prayed to God Thangjing. God sent a whirlwind bearing flowery fragrances towards Khamba. Khamba found a tree with many flowers. He gathered the flowers. On his way back, he sang songs in honor of princess Moirang Thoibi. Kongyamba heard the song. He became angry. Kongyamba asked Khamba to carry his flowers too but Khamba said no. They fought. They only stopped when they became hungry. The sweet smell of the delicious food of Khamba was very rich. So Kongyamba was wondering about it. Meanwhile, the crows came down and ate Kongyamba's foods. So he was very angry. Back at home, Kongyamba fell enraged with his wife. Kongyamba sent his men to know about Khamba's dainty foods. In the Palace, they asked the "Ningon Lakpa" (women affairs minister) if there had been a feast. But there was no feast. Then, Kongyamba thought of evil plots against Khamba. So, he gathered many people in front of Khamba's house. He announced that everyone should wear dresses of luxury and jewels of gold and silver in the festival of the Gods. He lied that it was the King's order. Everyone believed him. Khamnu asked him about what he was saying. Kongyamba scolded her if she has no ears for not listening to the King's order. She wept of shame. Khamba fell sad because he had such clothes. However, Khamba managed to find such clothes for himself. Kongyamba offered the flowers to the royalties and the nobles. First, he offered some to the King. Secondly, he offered some to the Queen. Later, he offered the rest to the High Officers of the kingdom. Everyone was more pleased with the flowers of Khamba. So, they gave him rare gifts. Gifts received by Khamba were many times more valuable than the customary presents received by Kongyamba. During the dancing ceremony, Kongyamba and his wives danced first. Later, Khamba and Thoibi danced before God Thangjing's holy shrine. People were more pleased with the dance of Khamba and Thoibi in comparison to that of Nongban and his wives.

=== Annual Sports Championship ===
Kongyamba fell jealous of Khamba's increasing fame. Sportsmen prepared for the annual racing and wrestling championships. The officers of the respective "Pana"s (State Provinces) chose their respective champions. For Khamba's pana, he was chosen. He ran far very fast with his chest held low. For Kongyamba's pana, he was selected. But Kongyamba ran with his head high. He ran fast but not for very far. The championship organizers made that year's race longer than it had been the year before. In both wrestling and running, both Khamba and Kongyamba were the best on their own teams. At that day's night, Kongyamba planned with his men how to defeat Khamba.

"Many are the races I have won, and heavy will be my disgrace if this year I am second to Khamba."<

On the next day, Kongyamba announced to the people,

"It is evil for land if a poor man win the race. It might bring scarcity more than the people can bear. Let's say this among the people before the race begin."

This words spread among the public. Khamba was stopped and told that his name was not in the list of the contestants. Khamba believed them. So, he sadly returned home. He told everything to Khamnu. The two siblings told Nongtholba about it. Nongtholba went to the king. The king told Khamba to participate if it was not still late to join. Khamba and Feiroijamba went to the starting place of the race. The race was about to be started. Khamba ran swiftly as fast as he could. Then, Kongyamba's men interrupted Khamba on his way. But Khamba stroke all of them aside. At last, he reached up Kongyamba. Kongyamba was running slowly as he got tired. Suddenly, fifteen horsemen of Kongyamba stopped Khamba. But Khamba kicked out all of them from his way. Finally, Khamba reached the final destination. He was the champion and Kongyamba was the second. Both saluted the King. The King was more pleased with Khamba.

=== The false oracle and the feral bull ===
Kongyamba was thinking about an evil plot against Khamba. But the Gods did not give him any evil hints in his dreams. So, he built a hut. Inside the hut, he tried to connect with a spirit. But he failed. One day, he met fisher women from the Khuman kingdom in the region of Moirang. Both the Khuman kingdom and the Moirang kingdom were in shores of the Loktak lake. The women came to Moirang besides having their own fishing area. So, Kongyamba asked them the reason for coming to Moirang.

The women told him:

"There is a great bull that lurks among the reeds of the shores of the lake, and it had claimed life of many. So, we dare not to fish there."

Suddenly, an idea came to Kongyamba's mind. He went to the king. He acted as a person possessed by a divine spirit. Kongyamba told the King,

"God Thangjing had spoken in my ears and I have his behest upon me. Verily said the God, I am sated with offerings of flesh and fish, but this year, my heart longs for the sweet savour of the flesh of the mighty bull that lurks in the reeds that border the water of the lake. My servant Khamba vows that he will bring it for my honor and for the welfare of the State."

The king called and asked Khamba about his promise. Khamba denied it. There resulted a great conflict between Khamba and Kongyamba. Later, Khamba told the king he would catch the bull if it was the God's will. The king was pleased with Khamba. So, he promised him to give Princess Thoibi hand in marriage if he succeeded in the adventure. Minister Thonglen put seven marks on the lintel post of the capital city. It was the record of the King's promise. The king of Moirang sent an embassy to the king of Khuman. The embassy proposed the great sport to be organized. The Khuman king agreed. A grand Colosseum was built. The Colosseum could hold a capacity of the audiences from both the two kingdoms.

Khamba captured the bull. He was bringing it to the two Kings' residing place. On the way back, Kongyamba came to him before anyone saw them. Kongyamba pretended to help Khamba to hold the bull. Kongyamba hold the rope. When everyone saw, Kongyamba claimed that he had captured the bull. He added that he even rescued Khamba who fell into the ditch. Once again, there was a great conflict between Khamba and Kongyamba over the claim. The two Kings could not find out who was right. So, Kongyamba was asked to fight the bull within an enclosure. But Kongyamba got frightened of the bull. So, he climbed up on the heights to save himself. Khamba faced the bull bravely. He once again captured the bull.

=== Royal archery contest and Nongban's advantage of gaining favour ===
Annually, a Royal archery contest was held in honour of God Thangjing in Ancient Moirang. The contest was for the royalties of the Moirang kingdom. Nongban Kongyamba was selected to pick up the arrows shot by the King. Khamba was selected to pick up the arrows shot by the Crown Prince (King's younger brother). Chingkhu Akhuba, the Crown Prince asked his daughter Thoibi about his Coat Of Golden Embroidery. But Thoibi had already given the coat to Khamba. So, she told him a white lie. On the day of the competition, the target was set. The royal priests sang charms over the arrows and the bows of the contestants. The King shot his arrows. Kongyamba fetched the arrows and gave back to the king. For the Crown Prince, Khamba was to fetch the arrows. The Crown Prince shot his arrows so swiftly. Khamba ran swiftly to pick them up. At this, Khamba's outer cloth get loosened. The Crown Prince saw the inner cloth worn by Khamba. It was his golden embroidered coat. He got furious. When Khamba gave him the arrow, he did not take it. He turned away from Khamba. Kongyamba took the arrow from Khamba. He gave it to the Prince. The Prince was pleased with Kongyamba. He told Kongyamba that princess Thoibi would be given to him within five days. From this time onwards, Nongban Kongyamba gained favor from Thoibi's father, the Crown Prince.

=== Torture by Elephant: Collective evil planning of Nongban and Thoibi's father against Khamba ===
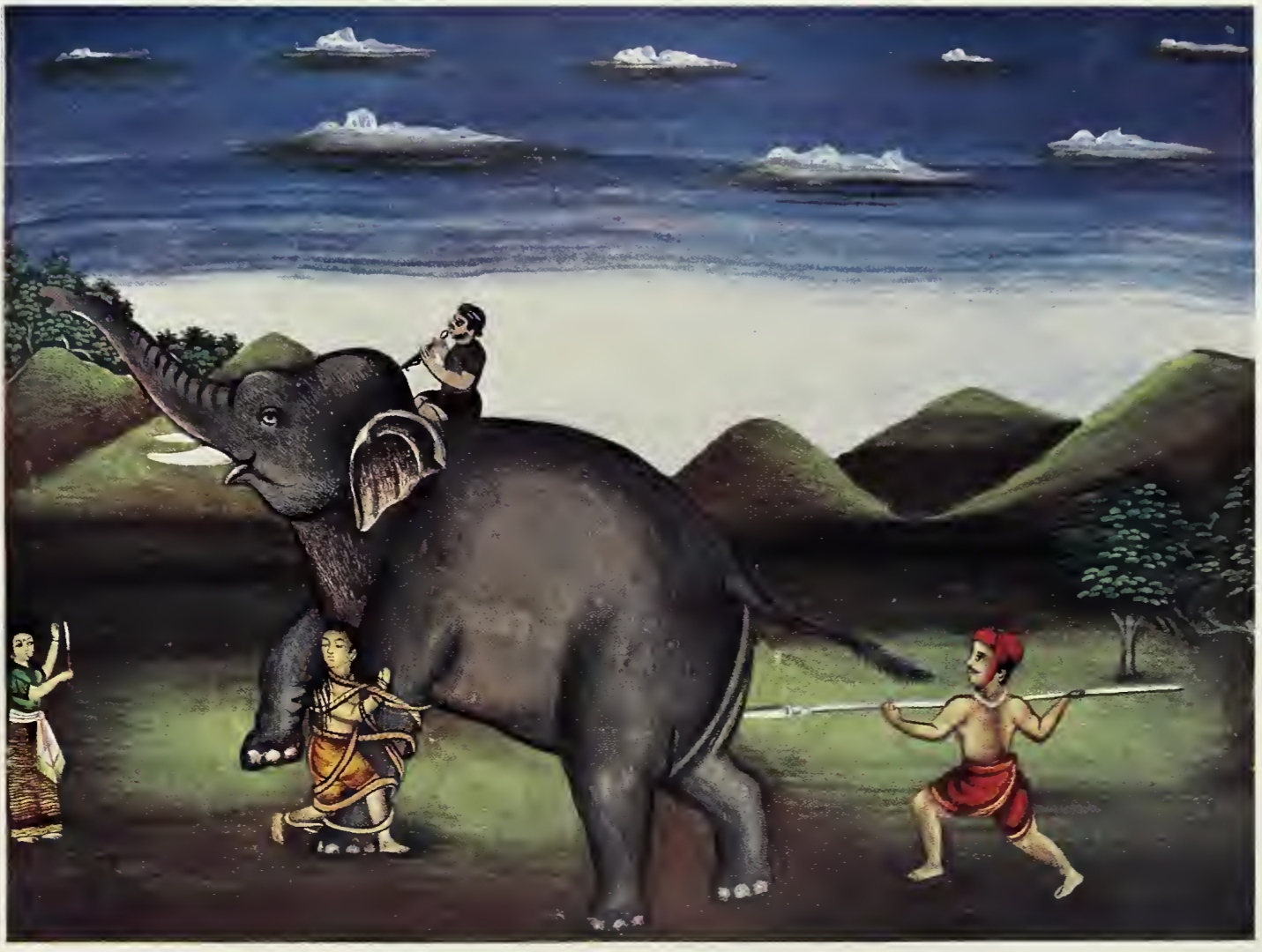
Nongban Kongyamba speared at the elephant's back to torture Khamba. But Thoibi saved Khamba in time.

The Crown Prince and Nongban Kongyamba planned an evil plot to kill Khamba. They sent messengers to Khamba. The messengers told Khamba that he was called by the Crown Prince. On his way, Khamba was interrupted by Kongyamba and his men. Kongyamba asked Khamba to give up Thoibi. Khamba replied that he will not give up. As a result, they fought. Khamba threw Kongyamba's men upon the ground. Khamba knelt upon Kongyamba's belly. He pressed Kongyamba's throat. He was about to kill Kongyamba. But Kongyamba's men dragged Khamba off. They beat Khamba. His clothes were torn. They bound him so that he could not move. The Prince also came up on his elephant. He told the men to beat him. They fastened him to the elephant's leg with ropes. However, the elephant driver knew that Khamba was innocent. So, he bound him leaving him some spaces to breathe. Then they stimulated the elephant to harm Khamba. But God Thangjing let it not to move. Finally, Kongyamba hit the elephant with a spear to move in pain. But it did not harm Khamba. In that night, Goddess Panthoibi told Thoibi in her dream that her beloved man was bound by her father's orders to the elephant and was nearly killed. Thoibi arose and took a sword. She immediately came to the spot for Khamba. The criminals feld from the spot. She saved Khamba from the criminals as well as the elephant. The news was informed to Khamnu, Feiroijamba, Nongtholba and Thonglen. Nongtholba, Feiroijamba and Thonglen went to the Royal Court with all their armies. Feiroijamba said to the Court three times about the harsh cruelty to Khamba. However, the Prince did not pay attention to the complaint. Nongtholba and Prince Chingkhu Akhuba had a conflict on the matter. The conflict could not be resolved without the King. Finally, both went to the King for the judgement. Before their arrival, Princess Thoibi had already informed the king all the crimes committed by her own father.

The King proclaimed that all the criminals would be punished. So, Nongban Kongyamba, Prince Chingkhu Akhuba (Thoibi's father) and other men were sent in the prison. The King told the Prince to stay there until Khamba was well again. The King sent his own men to take care of injured Khamba. He sent him gifts every day. Thoibi personally took care of Khamba. He got well again. So, Nongban Kongyamba and the Prince were set free.

== Plot to kidnap Princess Thoibi ==
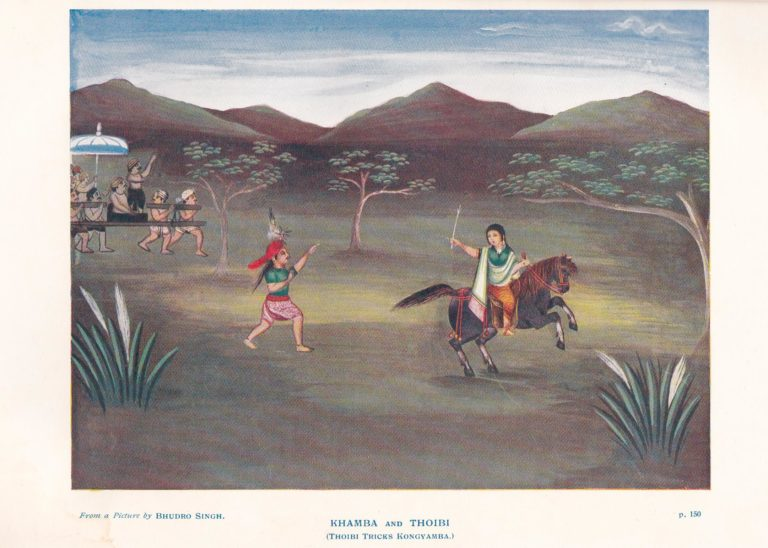
Thoibi escaped from Angom Nongban Kongyamba by tricking him.

The Prince asked his daughter Thoibi to marry Kongyamba. But she rejected. So, in anger, he exiled her to Kabaw chiefdom. He did not want to see her anymore. During her exile, Thoibi always missed her beloved Khamba as well as her hometown. God Thangjing softened her father's heart. He sent men to bring her back. However, he asked Kongyamba to forcibly elope Thoibi from her return journey.

Kongyamba and his men were waiting for Princess Thobi's return. When they saw the princess returning, his men shouted, "Lo, the Princess is at band." Thoibi heard the shout. She instructed her companions to sit near her if the man was Khamba but far away if the man was Kongyamba." It was Kongyamba and not Khamba. However, she went on. She pretended to be friendly with him. She sat on the red carpet of Kongyamba's possession. However, she placed a stick between Kongyamba and her. She asked him for fruits to eat. Kongyamba brought her fruits. But she did not eat the fruits. She pretended to get ill due to her long journey from Kabaw. Kongyamba was worried. She asked Kongyamba to let her ride on his horse. He agreed. So, Thoibi rode Kongyamba's horse. Kongyamba rode in Thoibi's palanquin. Surprisingly, Thoibi galloped off on the horse towards Khamba's house. Khamba received her from the long time exile at his house. They wept for their reunion. On the other hand, Kongyamba was angry for being tricked by a girl. He tried to gain support from the King's ministers to intervene into the matter. In the meantime, Minister Thonglen and Minister Nongtholba sent men to guard Khamba and Thoibi. The matter was set before the King in the Royal Court. The king wanted to solve the issue by the trial of the spear. During the discussion, an old man came to the meet the king. The old man informed him that a ferocious tiger was a great threat to the villagers of Khoirentak region. The King changed his mind. He announced that the tiger will be the determining point of the matter. He added that the killer of the tiger will marry Princess Thoibi.

== Death ==
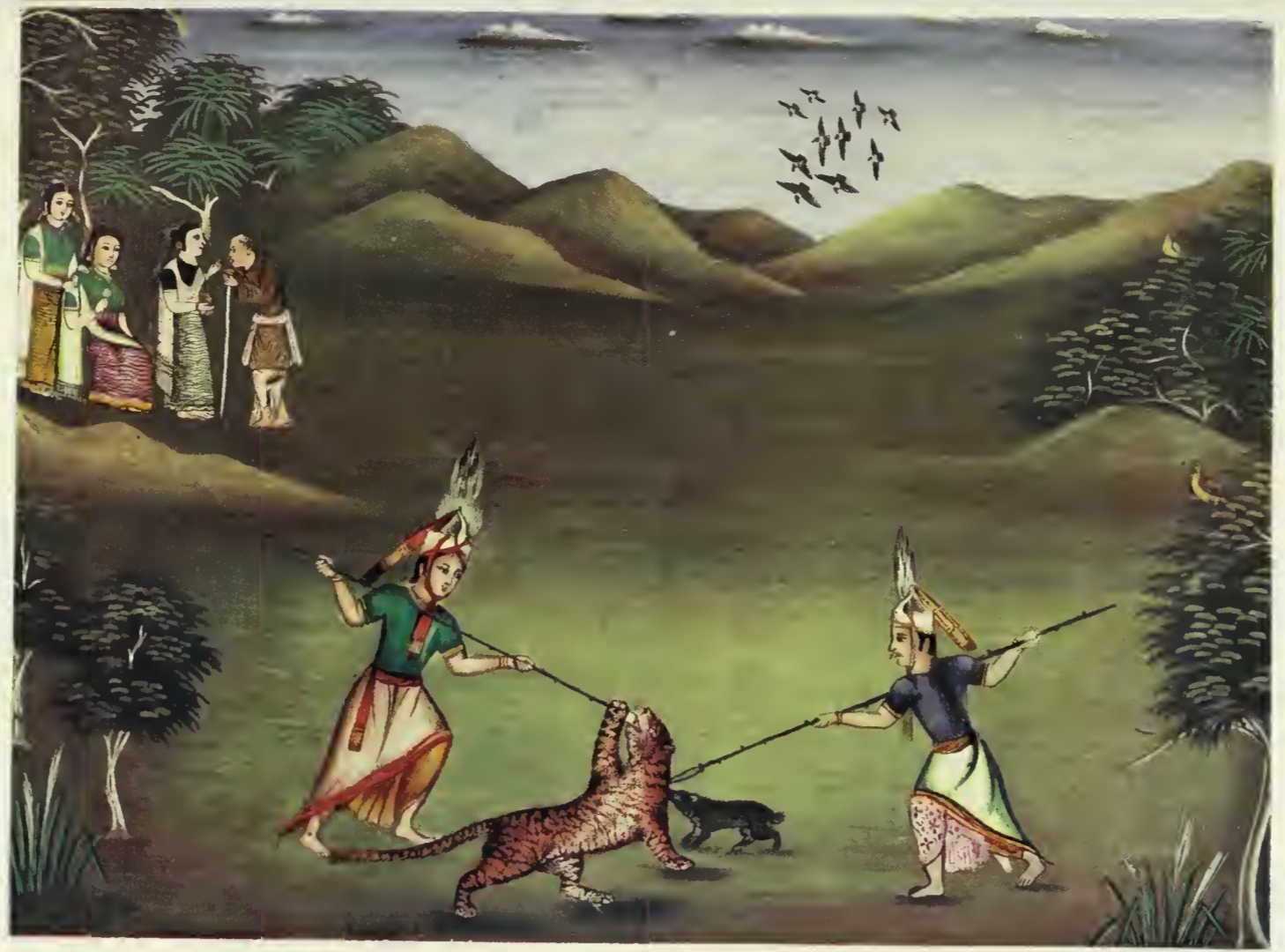
Nongban and Khamba in the tiger hunt.

King Chingkhu Telheiba of Moirang announced that the killer of the man-eating tiger of Khoirentak could marry princess Thoibi. Nongban Kongyamba and Khuman Khamba were chosen for the task. The ferocious tiger killed Nongban during the hunt.

== Rebirth as a singing bird ==
In his dying bed, Nongban requested Khuman Khamba to allow him to sing a song about princess Thoibi (alias Thadoi). The request was granted. After he died, his soul turned into a legendary bird named "Pithadoi" ("Pee Thadoi"). Pee Thadoi continued to sing songs about Thadoi. His songs are sung in pathetic and tragic notes.

== In popular culture ==
=== Kao, the sacred bull ===
In 2011, "Kao, the sacred bull" was produced by the Laihui Ensemble. This theatrical show was based on the story of Kao (bull) captured by Khuman Khamba. According to the story, the Oracle (Nongban himself) chose Khamba to capture the bull.

=== Kao Faba ===
In 2020, a Shumang Kumhei named "Kao Faba" was produced by Western Cultural Association in Manipur. It was sponsored by the Sangeet Natak Akedemi of New Delhi, India. The play was released in the Iboyaima Shumang Leela Shanglen, Palace Compound, Imphal. The play is based on the legend of capturing the bull in Ancient Moirang.

== Other websites ==
- Nongban_archive.org
