= Khuman Khamba =

Hero in Meitei folklore

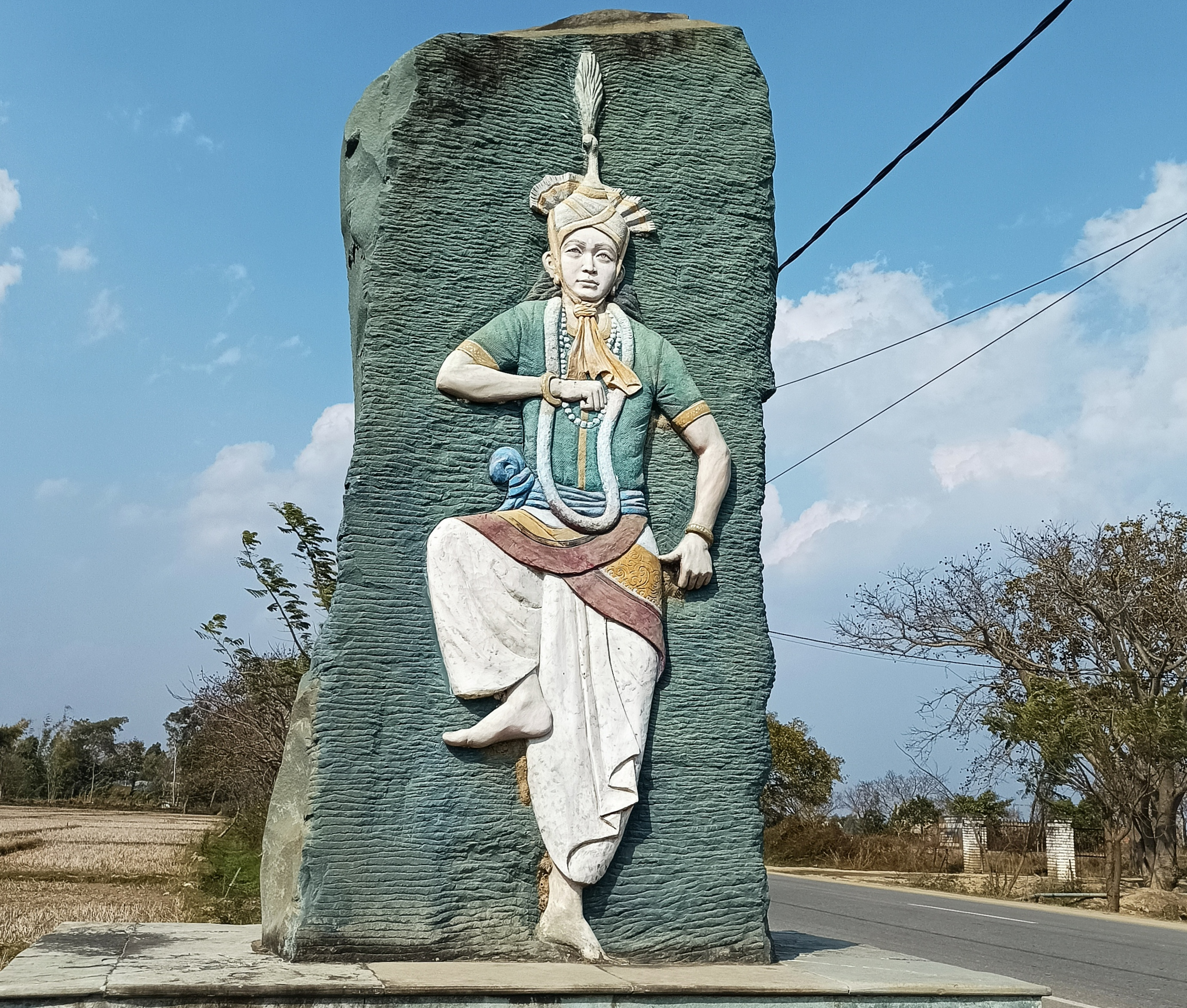
- A relief sculpture of Khuman Khamba in Bishnupur district, Manipur, India

In-universe information
- Alias: Moirang Khamba
- Gender: Male
- Title: Amudon Nongyai
- Occupation: Leiloi Hanchapa (Leiroi Hanjaba) (Floriculture department minister)
- Affiliation: Meitei folklore (Manipuri folklore); Meitei mythology (Manipuri mythology); Moirang Kangleirol; Moirang Saiyon; Khamba Thoibi
- Family: Khuman clan
- Spouse: Moirang Thoibi
- Relatives: Khamnu (elder sister)
- Religion: Meitei religion (Sanamahism)
- Origin: Khuman kingdom
- Home: Ancient Moirang

Khuman Khamba or Moirang Khamba is a hero in Meitei folklore. He belongs to the Khuman clan (Meitei: Khuman Salai). He is the hero as well as the protagonist of the Meitei epic poem Khamba Thoibi of the Moirang Shayon legends in the Moirang Kangleirol genres from Ancient Moirang. He is the son of nobleman Puremba, the then prime minister of the ancient Moirang Kingdom. He became an orphan at a very young age when his parents died. He was raised in poverty by his elder sister Khamnu. Later, he married princess Thoibi of Ancient Moirang kingdom.

== Etymology ==
The word "Khamba" means ultimate or fullness in the Meitei language.

== Early life and meeting Princess Thiobi ==
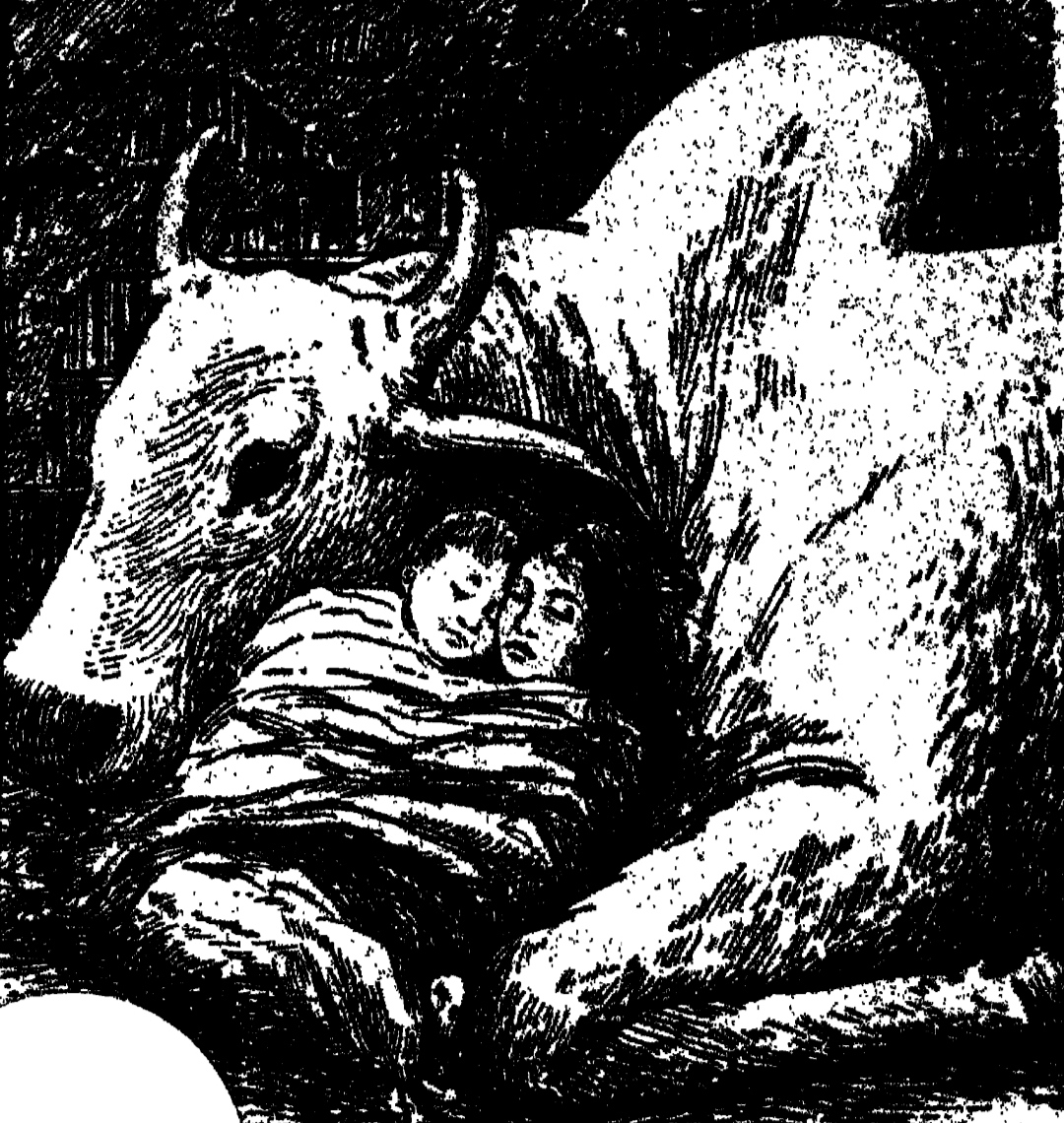
Orphan Khamba and his sister Khamnu were taken care of by Kao (bull) for a long time until Khamnu set it free.

Khamba and his sister Khamnu were orphaned at a young age. For a time, Purenba's closest friends, Nongthonba and Thonglen, took care of them. The two children were not happy with them, so they returned to the house they had lived in with their parents. They were happy there even though no one came to help them.

Khamba was brought up by his sister Khamnu. She went from place to place to find help and work. For example, she husked paddy for some people and, in exchange, the women breastfed the infant Khamba. As the two siblings grew up, to earn a living, Khamnu sold wood in a market in Moirang. One day, Princess Thoibi met Khamnu. The two became friends. Thoibi asked Khamnu many questions. She gave Khamnu food and jewelry. Thoibi asked Khamnu to come with her on a fishing trip in Loktak lake. The king heard that the princess and her companions were to sport on the lake, so he ordered that no man should go to the lake. Khamnu told Khamba about the royal order. On the day of the fishing trip, she left him at home.

Khamba had a dream. In his dream, Goddess Ayangleima (either Panthoibi or Koiren Leima) appeared to him in the form of Khamnu and asked him to fetch vegetables. Khamba woke up and wondered about the dream. The god Thangjing made him think that he had truly seen his sister. So he rowed a boat onto the lake, but he went in the wrong direction. The god Thangjing sent clouds and storms over the hills, and the wind blew the boat towards where Thoibi was fishing. Thoibi saw Khamba standing nearby. She asked Khamnu if she knew the strange man disobeying the royal order. Khamnu said no. Khamba did not know what to do. Hearing his sister's voice, he came closer. Thoibi saw that he was handsome, manly, muscular and well fashioned. Khamba was also amazed at Thoibi's beauty and glamour. It was God's will that they should be lovers. Khamnu worried that her brother might be punished for disobeying the king. Thoibi noticed that some of the fabric in Khamnu's clothes matchied Khamba's headdress. She also saw that Khamba was wearing the bracelet she had given to Khamnu. Later, Khamnu admitted that this man was her brother. Then, Thoibi became kind to Khamba. She offered him delicate foods. She pleasantly told him to go home before the king's noticed he was there.

== Lover ==
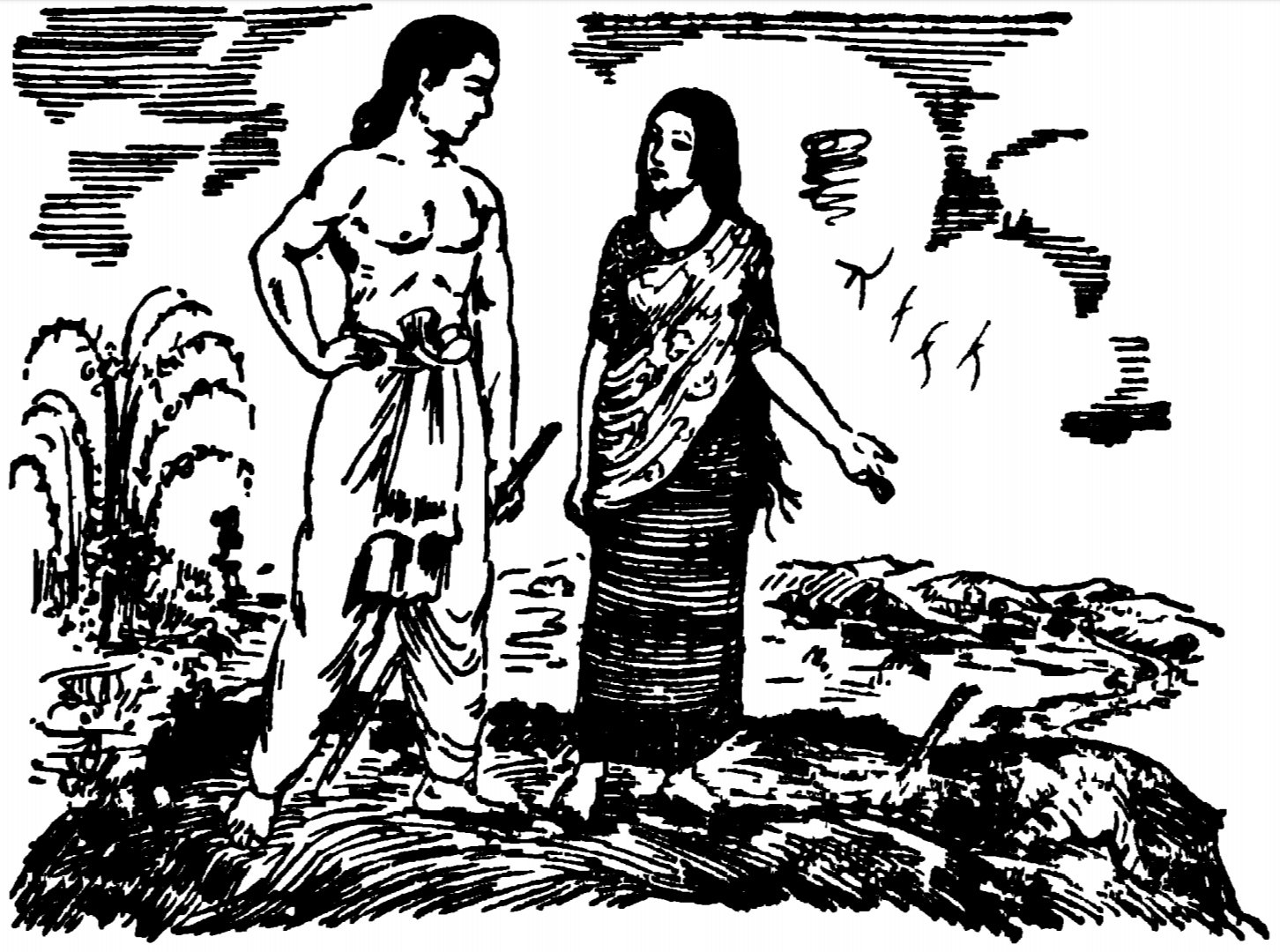
Khamba and Thoibi meeting at a place

Princess Thoibi visited Khamnu's house, and she saw it was old and full of holes. Khamba hid himself underneath a mat. Thoibi saw the mat and asked Khamnu about it. Khamnu said that it was where she worshipped place of God Khuman Pokpa. Thoibi, pretending not to know Khamba was hiding there, asked if she could pray to the God. She prayed aloud, asking the God to allow her to worship him daily in the house. Khamba heard her voice and laughed. Khamba came out of hiding and sent his sister to the market to bring some fruit. When they were alone, Thoibi gave Khamba gifts. The two bound themselves by an oath before God Khuman Pokpa. Both drank water in which a golden bracelet had been dipped and vowed to be lovers forever.

== Feats ==
Khuman Khamba is best known for being the paragon of masculinity and far-ranging adventures. Some of his feats are as follows:

1. Lifting up the stone slab in the Kabui village (Nung Thaang-gatpa)
2. Herding the prince's ox (San Senba)
3. Wrestling with Nongban (Mukna Saanaba)
4. Finding the orchid flowers (Lei Langba)
5. Winning a race despite sabotage (Pana Lamchel)
6. Capturing a dangerous feral bull (Kao Phaba)
7. Hunting in the Torbung region (Torbung Sadaanba)
8. Killing the Khoirentak tiger (Kei Phaba)

=== Wrestling with Nongban: Khamba's identity and fame ===
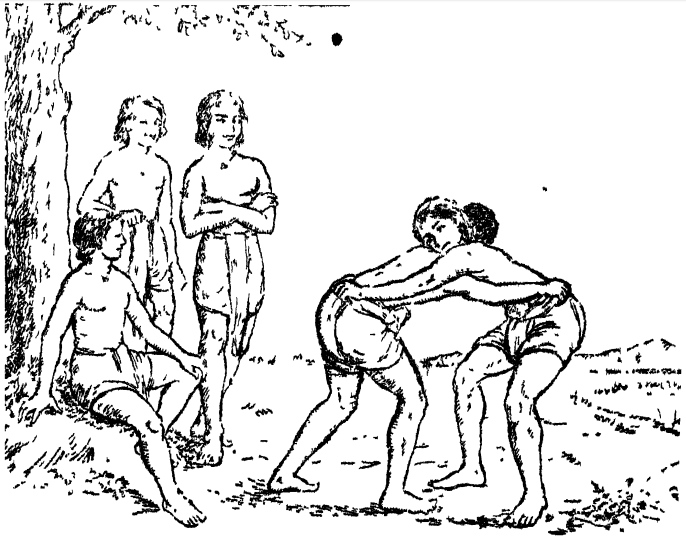
Khamba wrestling with his opponent

Khamba went out among the menfolk and joined a wrestling club. Nongban was the champion of the kingdom. He invited Khamba to wrestle against him. To everyone's surprise, Nongban lost to Khamba. Minister Nongthonba asked Khamba his name. At first, Khamba decided against exposing his true identity. He had already warned by his sister not to tell anyone about his true identity. Later, he revealed his name, but he did not tell his father's name. At first, Minister Nongthonba was angry that Khamba would not tell his father's name. Khamba explained that his father died when he was an infant and that his sister brought him up. Minister Nongthonba then realized that Khamba looked like his old friend Purenba.

"True is indeed that the elephant knows not his own brother, and kings forget their sons. Your father died ere his prime, even as a tree dies when men strip it of its bark."

Nongthonba dearly loved Khamba. In happiness, he told his wives of the lad he had met. He told them to prepare for fine clothes and a delicious meal for Khamba and Khamnu. Nongthonba took Khamba to the market place. Chingkhu Akhuba, the King's brother, was in the marketplace. Nongthonba introduced Khamba to Chingkhu Akhuba. Then, they introduced Khamba to the King. The King was pleased to see Khamba. The King's brother was also kind to Khamba. He told his people about Khamba and his late father Purenba's high official position, status and glories.

=== Finding the orchid flowers ===
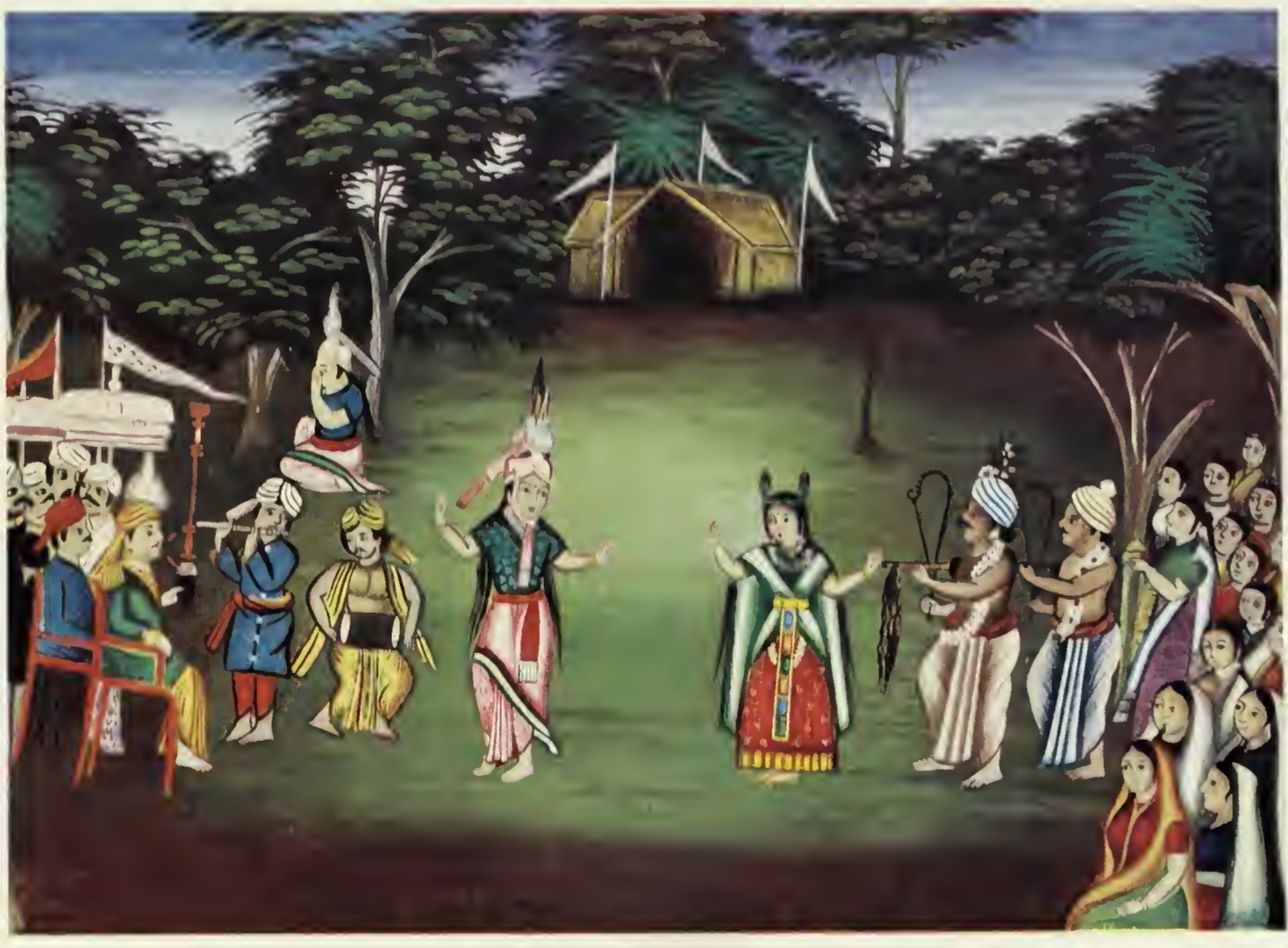
Khamba and Thoibi during a ceremonial ritual dance

King Chingkhu Telheiba made Khamba the "Khuntak Leiroi Hanjaba" (Floriculture Minister) to gather flowers from the hills. Thoibi packed delicious foods for Khamba. The next day, Khamba and Angom Nongban Kongyamba went to collect flowers. Nongban Kongyamba claimed they were on his father's land and threatened Khamba. Khamba did not know Nongban was lying. Khamba asked where his own father had gathered flowers. Kongyamba randomly pointed to the southern hills. Khamba went there but found no flowers. So, he prayed to Thangjing. The god took pity on Khamba. He sent a whirlwind bearing flowery fragrances towards Khamba. Khamba found a tree with many flowers. He gathered the flowers and threw them down the ground. By the grace of the God, not a petal of a single flower was broken. On his way back to the palace, he sang songs in honor of the princess. Kongyamba heard them and was furious. Kongyamba asked Khamba to carry his flowers too, but Khamba said no. The two fought until they got hungry. Kongyamba smelled the food the princess had packed for Khamba and wondered about it. Another day, Kongyamba sent his men to investigate where Khamba had gotten delicacies. In the palace, they asked the minister of women's affairs, "Ningon Lakpa" if there had been a feast. Kongyamba thought up more evil plots against Khamba. He gathered many people in front of Khamba's house. He announced that everyone should wear their richest clothes and jewels of gold and silver in the festival of the Gods. He lied and said it was the King's order. When Khamnu asked him about what he was saying, Kongyamba scolded her until she wept. Khamba felt sad because he did not have clothes of that quality. In that night's dream of the two siblings, their parents told them where they could find honorable clothes in Thonglen's house. Immediately, they woke up. Even though it was still night, they went to Thonglen's house. The guards seized them, thinking them thieves. They brought Khamba and Khamnu to Thonglen in the morning. But Thonglen knew the children of his old friend Purenba. He gave them the clothes. He even taught them the dance. He also sent men and women to serve Khamba and Khamnu and began building them a new house. Thoibi and Senu came to Khamba's house with gifts. But they did not recognize the house because it was so well built. Thoibi was shocked to see Khamnu and Khamba wearing rich clothes. She worried that Khamba might have married a daughter of some rich man. Later, she learned the truth. Kongyamba offered the flowers to the royalties and the nobles. First, he offered some to the King. Secondly, he offered some to the Queen. Later, he offered the rest to the High Officers of the kingdom. It was then Khamba's turn. He feared about the code of conducts. So, he humbly asked the counsel of priestess. For Khamba, they first offer the flowers to God Thangjing. After that, Khamba presented the flowers to the King, to the Queen and then to the High Officers of the kingdom. Everyone was pleased with the flowers of Khamba. So, they gave him rare gifts. Gifts received by Khamba were many times more valuable than the customary presents received by Kongyamba.

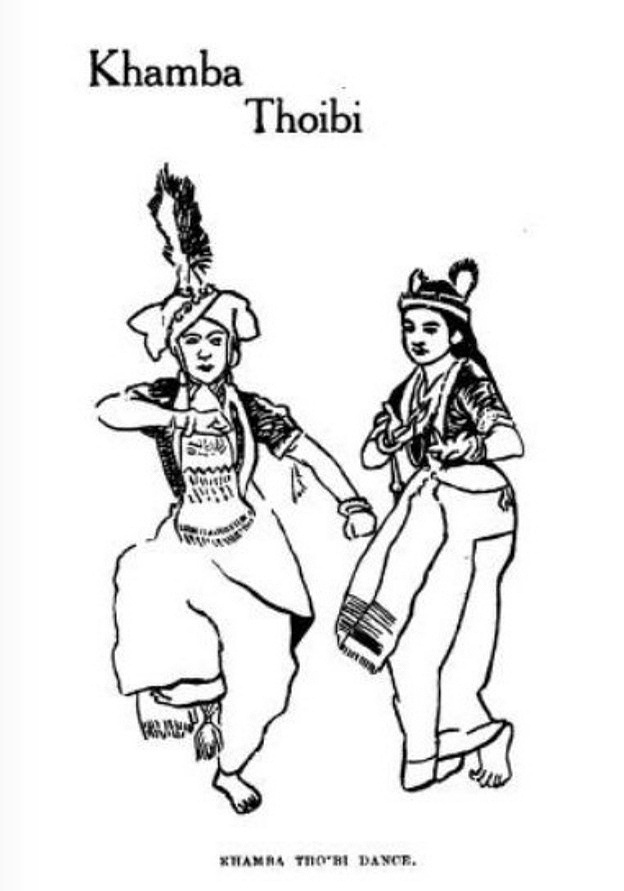
Khamba and Thoibi dancing

During the dancing ceremony, Kongyamba and his noble wives danced first. Later, Khamba and Thoibi danced before God Thangjing's holy shrine. The latter's pairing was great. The audiences shouted with joy during the dance. Finally, Khamba and Thoibi knelt before God Thangjing.

=== Overcoming the unfair race: Annual Sports Championship ===
Khamba's increasing fame caused Nongban Kongyamba to feel jealous of him. There was an annual sports championship in Ancient Moirang. Contestants began to prepare for the racing and wrestling championships. The officers of the respective Panas (State Provinces) chose their champions. Khamba was chosen to represent his Pana. His running style was to move very fast with his chest held low. Kongyamba was selected to represent his Pana. He also ran fast, but with his head high, so he could not keep up his speed for long distances. That year, the championship organizers lengthened the racecourse. In both wrestling and running, both Khamba and Kongyamba were champions of their respective parties. One night, Kongyamba planned with his men how to defeat Khamba.

"Many are the races I have won, and heavy will be my disgrace if this year I am second to Khamba."

On the other hand, Khamnu worried if Khamba's contenders might harm Khamba in jealousy. On the next day, Kongyamba announced to the people,

"It is evil for land if a poor man win the race. It might bring scarcity more than the people can bear. Let's say this among the people before the race begin."

This words spread among the public. Khamba was stopped and told that his name was not in the list of the contestants. Khamba believed them. So, he sadly returned home. He told everything to Khamnu. The two siblings told Nongtholba about it. Nongtholba went to the king. The king told Khamba to participate if it was not still late to join. Khamba and Feiroijamba went to the starting place of the race. They saw the race was about to be started. They shouted that they bore the King's order. Khamba ran swiftly as fast as he could. Then, Kongyamba's men interrupted Khamba on his way. But Khamba stroke all of them aside. At last, he reached up Kongyamba. Kongyamba was running slowly as he got tired. Suddenly, fifteen horsemen of Kongyamba stopped Khamba. But Khamba kicked out all of them from his way. Khamnu shouted "Run on Khamba, for your father's honor." Finally, Khamba reached the final destination. He was the champion and Kongyamba was the second. Both saluted the King. The King was more pleased with Khamba. He gifted Khamba a gold embroidered coat. The Queen gifted Khamba luxurious clothes. The ministers also piled heaps of gifts upon Khamba. Khamba and his sister Khamnu generously offered many of the gifted clothes to the old men and women.

=== Capturing the fearsome feral bull ===
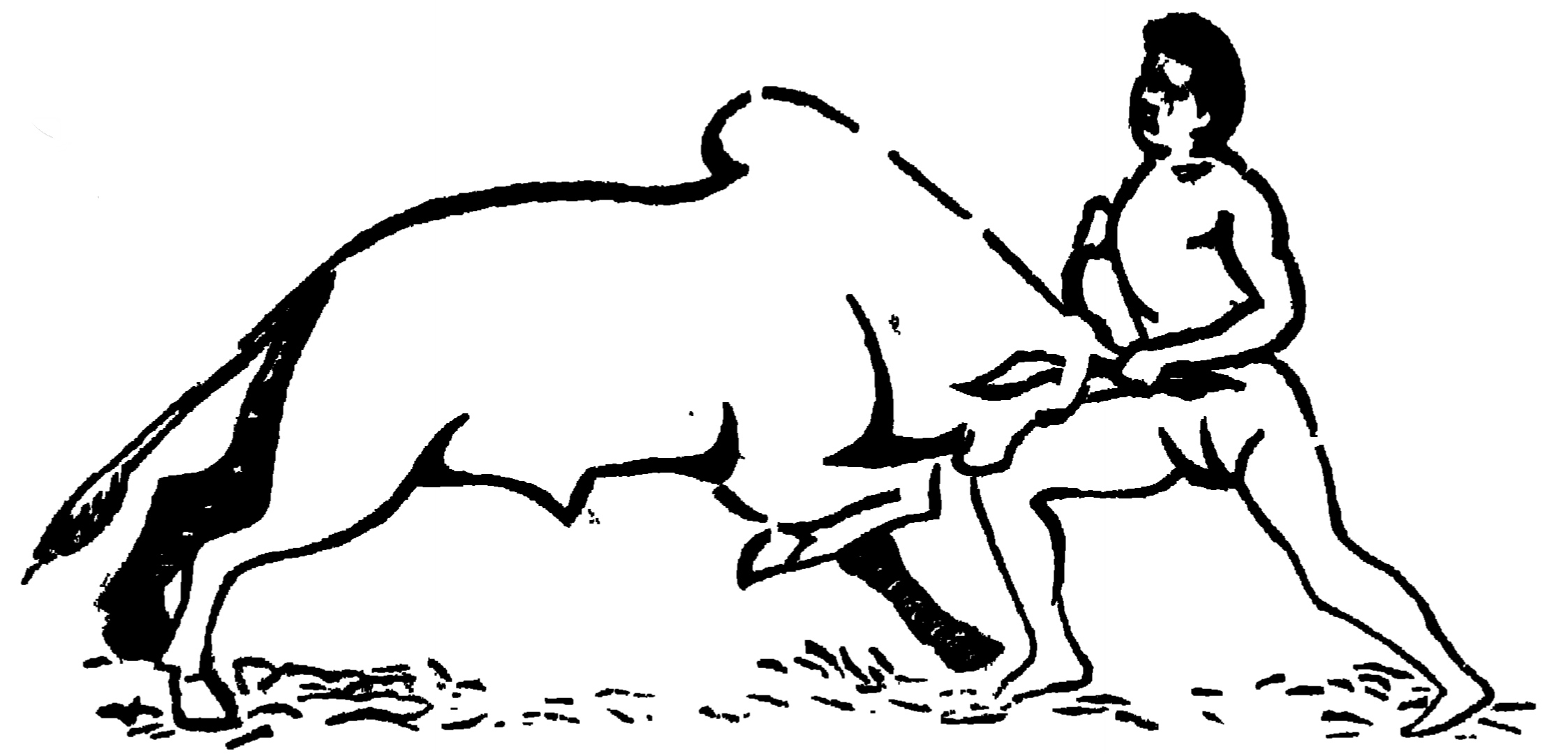
Khamba capturing the feral bull

Nongban Kongyamba again plotted against Khamba. He heard of the Kao (bull) roaming in the Khuman kingdom. He went to the king and acted if he were possessed by a divine spirit. Kongyamba told the King,

"God Thangjing had spoken in my ears and I have his behest upon me. Verily said the God, I am sated with offerings of flesh and fish, but this year, my heart longs for the sweet savour of the flesh of the mighty bull that lurks in the reeds that border the water of the lake. My servant Khamba vows that he will bring it for my honor and for the welfare of the State."

The king called and asked Khamba about his promise. Khamba denied it. There resulted a great conflict between Khamba and Kongyamba. Later, Khamba told the king he would catch the bull if it was the God's will. The king was pleased with Khamba. He promised him to give Princess Thoibi's hand in marriage if he succeeded. The king of Moirang sent an embassy to the king of Khuman. The embassy proposed organizing the great sport, and the Khuman king agreed. A grand colosseum was built for the event. Meanwhile, Khamnu revealed a secret to Khamba. She said,

"This great bull was once the Lord of your father's herd. Go to him, speak your father's name in his ear, and show him this rope of silk."

On the day of the event, Khamba stood face to face with the bull. The bull charged towards him, but Khamba dodged. The audience asked him if he was afraid. Khamba said that he was waiting for a good position. Then, he stood on firm ground and caught the bull. The mighty bull carried him away into the thick woods. Khamba did everything his sister said. Immediately, the feral bull became tame. Khamba began to bring the bull back to the colosseum. Kongyamba intercepted him and pretended to help Khamba to hold the bull, but when they came within view of the spectators from the two kingdoms, Kongyamba claimed that he had captured the bull himself. He claimed he had even rescued Khamba, who had fallen into the ditch. Once again, there was a great conflict between Khamba and Kongyamba. The two kings could not tell who spoke the truth. So, Kongyamba was asked to fight the bull within an enclosure. But Kongyamba became frightened of the bull and climbed up the wall to get away from it. Khamba faced the bull bravely. He once again captured the bull. Both the kings honoured Khamba and gave him gifts. Since Khamba was of Khuman blood, the Khuman king asked the Moirang king to let Khamba live in the Khuman kingdom. The Moirang King did not agree.

=== Golden embroidered coat ===
Every year, there was a royal archery contest in honour of the God Thangjing. The contest was for the royals of the Moirang kingdom. Kongyamba was selected to pick up the arrows shot by the King. Khamba was selected to pick up the arrows shot by the crown prince, who was the king's younger brother. Prince Chingkhu Akhuba asked his daughter Thoibi about his Coat of Golden Embroidery. But Thoibi had already given the coat to Khamba. So she told him a lie. During the competition, the Crown Prince shot his arrows very swiftly. Khamba ran swiftly to pick them up and his outermost garment was loosened. The Crown Prince saw the clothes Khamba was wearing underneath: his own golden embroidered coat. He was furious. When Khamba gave him his arrow, he did not take it. He turned away from Khamba. Kongyamba took the arrow from Khamba. He gave it to the Prince. The Prince was pleased with Kongyamba. He told Kongyamba that princess Thoibi would be given to him within five days. Khamba and Khamnu were even told to bring him wedding gifts. The prince ordered that no one in the kingdom should sell fruit to the two siblings. Only Kongyamba was allowed to buy fruit. Khamba went to a hill village of a tribesmen group. He sought help from Kabui Salang Maiba, the tribal chief. The tribal chief offered him two basketful of fruits. The chief also added some gifts for the princess Thoibi, his sister Khamnu and for Khamba himself. Khamba thanked him and came back with the fruits and the gifts. Thoibi set the fruits ready in eleven special dishes. She was promised by the Chief Queen, 10 other Queens and 10 maids that they will receive gifts from Khamba. On the day of gift reception, Kongyamba brought his gifts. At his arrival, Thoibi pretended to fell with fever. So, Thoibi's father told Kongyamba the princess' health condition. Then, Kongyamba left. Few moments later, the Crown Prince had gone to meet the King. Thoibi instantly arose. Gifts from Khamba were received by the Queens and their maids warmly. At that moment, the Prince returned home. He was very thirsty. He longed for some juices of sour fruits. Thoibi prepared the juice from the fresh fruits brought by Khamba. She poured it into a silver cup for her father. The Prince has a sip of it. He asked for the whereabouts of the fruits. Thoibi told him that the fruits were brought by his son-in-law Khamba for his marriage. At this, the Prince got furious. He threw the silver cup at his daughter. Then, Thoibi pretended to faint. The Prince was terrified. At the same time, the Queens cried for her. He asked his daughter to get up and go to Khamba's house. Then, Thoibi arose. But her father resumed to his anger again.

=== Elephant plot ===
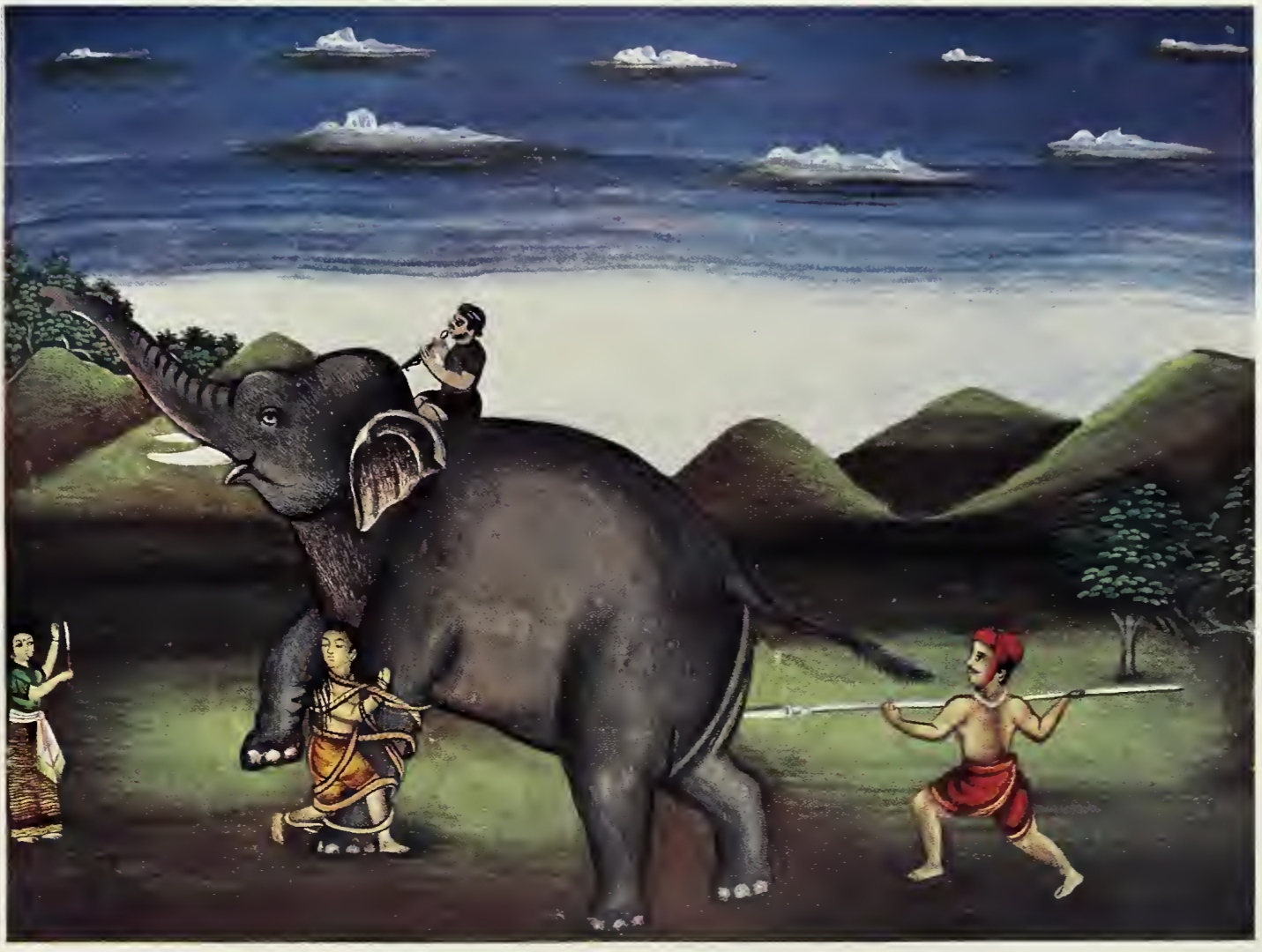
Khamba was about to be killed by his enemies. But Thoibi saved him in time.

Prince Chingkhu Akhuba and Nongban Kongyamba plotted together to kill Khamba. They sent a messenger to tell him to come meet Prince Chingkhu Akhuba. On the way there, Khamba was interrupted by Kongyamba and his men. Kongyamba asked Khamba to give up Thoibi. Khamba replied that he will not give her up. They felt and Khamba defeated Nongban Kongyamba and his men. He was about to kill Kongyamba, but Kongyamba's men pulled Khamba off him and beat him soundly. His clothes were torn. They tied him up. The Prince approached, riding his elephant. He told the men to beat Khamba further. They tied him to the elephant's leg with ropes. However, the elephant driver knew that Khamba was innocent, and he secretly left Khamba enough slack in the ropes to breathe. Then they drove the elephant to harm Khamba, but the god Thangjing did not let it. Finally, Kongyamba hit the elephant with a spear so it would move in pain. But it did not harm Khamba. That night, the Goddess Panthoibi came to Thoibi in a dream. She told Thiobi that her beloved man was bound by her father's orders to the elephant and had nearly been killed. Thoibi arose and took a sword. She found and released Khamba. Khamnu, Feiroijamba, Nongtholba and Thonglen were informed of the crime. Thonglen went to the court with all his army. Feiroijamba told the court three times about the crimes. But the prince did not pay attention to the complaint. Nongtholba angrily proclaimed that none could kill his son-in-law when he was alive. A conflict between Nongthonba and the prince developed. Finally, Nongtholba and Prince Chingkhu Akhuba went to the King. Before their arrival, Princess Thoibi had already informed the king all the crimes committed by her own father. King Chingkhu Telheiba proclaimed that all the criminals would be punished. He sent Prince Chingkhu Akhuba and Nongban Kongyamba to prison. The king told his brother prince to stay there until Khamba was well again. The King sent his own men to take care of the injured Khamba. He sent him gifts every day. Thoibi personally took care of Khamba. He got well again, and the criminals were set free. After this, Thoibi was exiled to the Kabaw chiefdom.

=== Killing the Khoirentak tiger ===
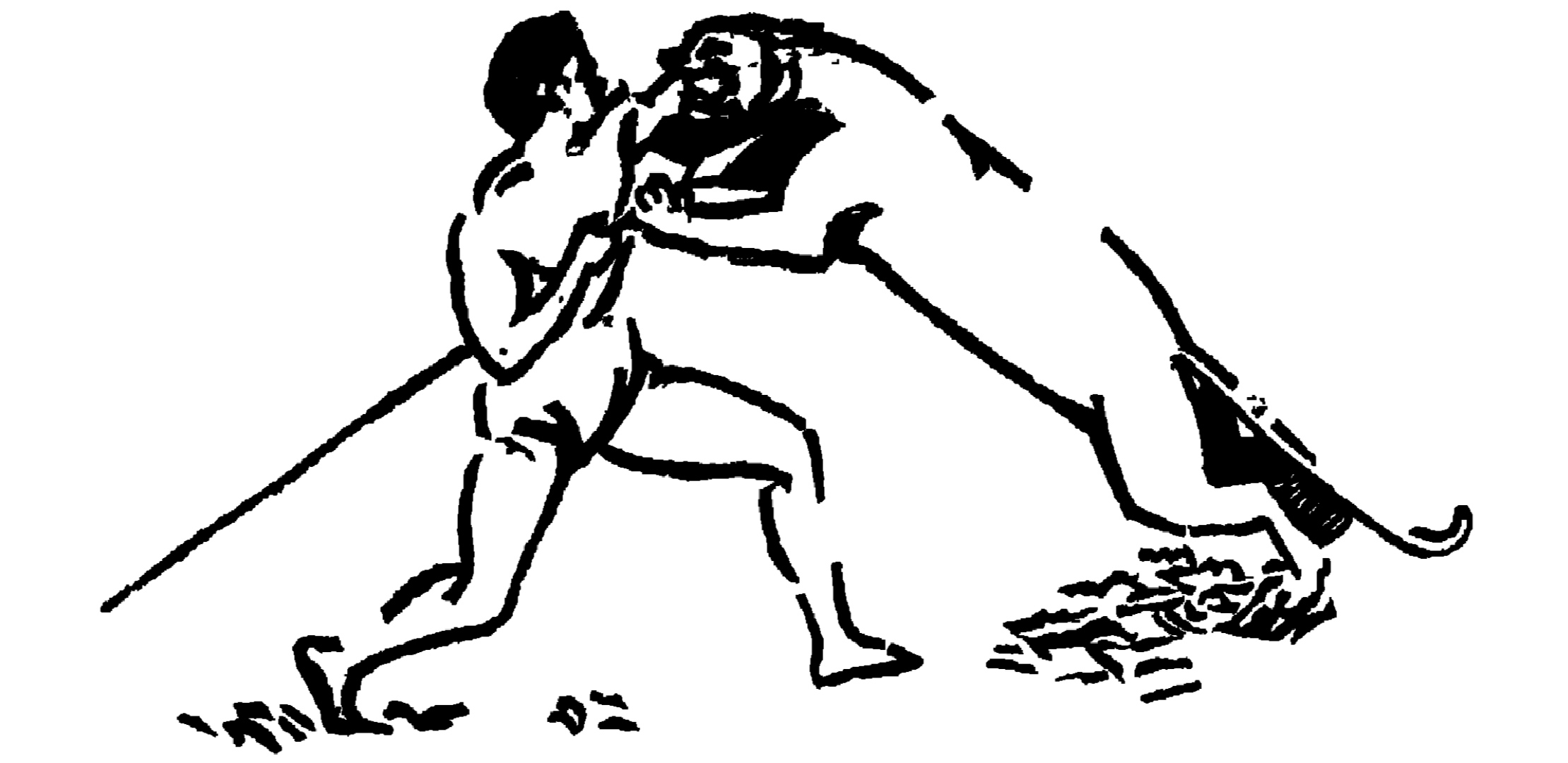
Khamba killing the Khoirentak tiger

Princess Thoibi's father exiled her to the Kabaw chiefdom. After some time, her father changed his mind and he asked her to come back. Meanwhile, Thoibi's father secretly told Nongban Kongyamba to intercept Thiobi on her return journey and forcibly elope with her. Thoibi met Nongban. She pretended to be friendly to him but suspected a trick. She asked to let her ride on his horse. Thoibi galloped off on the horse towards Khamba's house. They wept at their reunion. Minister Thonglen and Minister Nongtholba sent men to guard Khamba and Thoibi. Kongyamba was angry that he had been tricked by a girl. He set the matter before the king in the royal court. The king wanted to resolve the issue using trial by spear. But then an old man came to the meet the king and told him that a ferocious tiger was terrorizing villagers in the Khoirentak region. The king changed his mind. He announced that whoever killed the tiger would marry Princess Thoibi.

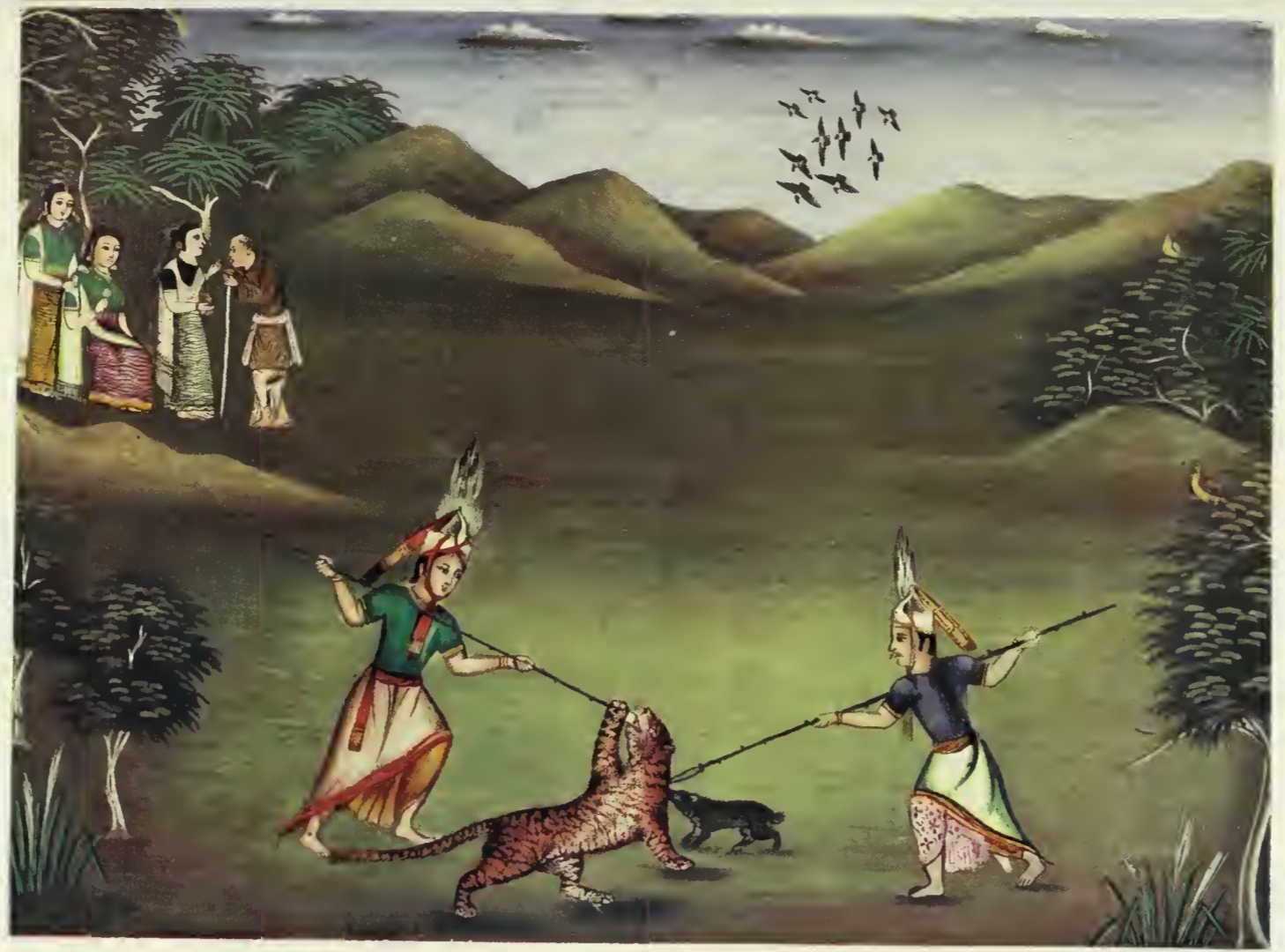
Khamba and Nongban Kongyamba during the tiger hunt

The trackers and scouts fenced in the part of the forest where the tiger had been seen. On the day of the event, the king and his ministers gathered in a nearby stadium. The mass of observers resembled a white cloth spread on the ground. Khamba and Kongyamba showed respect to the King. The two went on and found the traces of the tiger. A body of a recently killed girl was found on the way. They found the tiger and threw spears at it. But the tiger turned the spears away. It sprang upon and bit Kongyamba, and he was killed. Khamba attacked at the tiger. He drove it away. Khamba carried Kongyamba's body back to the stadium. Thonglen told Khamba,

"What! Are you afraid? Your father killed five tigers and you fear only one. Go or I will come and kill the beast."

Khamba re-entered the woods. The tiger was crouching, half hidden by the bushes. But the king and observers could see it from their perspective. The tiger jumped at Khamba. Khamba pierced the tiger's jaws with his spear. Finally, the beast was killed. The place where Khamba killed the tiger was near a Kom village. The King offered rich gifts to Khamba. He offered him great lands. Khamba was also given the rights of fishery, clothes of honor and titles of high fame. He was made the master of a salt-well.

== Marriage and death ==
Khamba and Thoibi got married in high state by the King of Moirang. One day, Khamba became to suspect Thoibi had been unfaithful to him. He decided to test her chastity. One night, he pretended to go away from home. Then, he secretly returned. Disguised as a stranger, he pierced a stick through the wall of Thoibi's room. He was teasing Thoibi. Thoibi was not aware of all this. So, she thought a stranger was trying to enter. She became furious. She thrust a spear through the wall to pierce the stranger. Khamba was severely wounded and called her. Thoibi recognized his voice. She immediately went outside and carried him in. Khamba was dying. She was extremely shocked. Before he died, she killed herself with the same spear. Khamba and Thoibi are the incarnations of a god and a goddess. They were sent by God Thangjing. Unlike normal mortal beings, God Thangjing denied their happiness of long life and children.

== In popular culture ==
=== Khamba Thoibi Jagoi ===
The Khamba Thoibi Jagoi was first performed by Khamba and Thoibi in the premise of the Thangjing temple. It is now a popular form of folk dance of Meitei culture (Manipuri culture) in Manipur.

=== Kao, the sacred bull ===
In 2010, the Laihui Ensemble produced an opera named "Kao, the sacred bull". It is based on the story of Khamba capturing the Kao bull.

=== Khambana Kao Phaba ===
In 2019, a painting titled "Khambana Kao Phaba" (Lit. Khamba capturing the bull) was exhibited in the Indira Gandhi Rashtriya Manav Sangrahalaya (IGRMS) Museum, Bhopal.

=== Kao Faba ===
In 2020, the legend of Khamba capturing Kao was produced in its theatrical form named as "Kao Faba". It was displayed in the Iboyaima Shummang Leela Shanglen, Palace Compound, Imphal.

== Related pages ==
- Khamba Thoibi
- Nongban
