= 2014 Indian general election in Manipur =

- 9 & 17 April 2014

2 seats
- Turnout: 79.75% (▲2.44%)
	First party
	INC
Party	INC
Seats won	2
Seat change	Steady
Percentage	41.70%
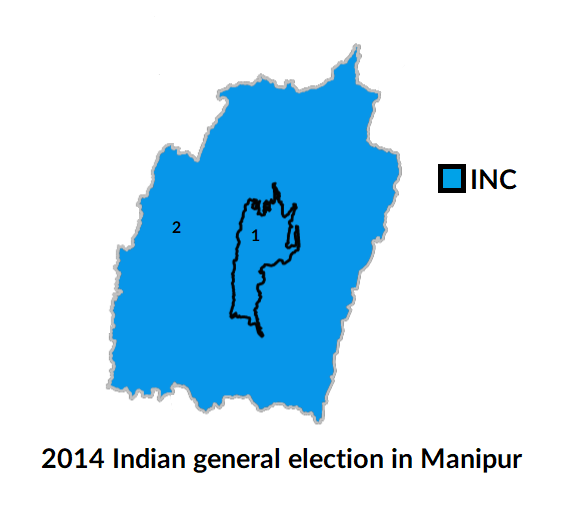
- 2014 Indian general election in Manipur
Prime Minister before election
Manmohan Singh
INC
Prime Minister after election
Narendra Modi
BJP

The 2014 Indian general election polls in Manipur for two Lok Sabha seats was held in two phases on 9 – 17 April 2014. As of 15 January 2014, the total voter count of Manipur was 1,739,005. Voters turnout in Manipur was 80%.

== Parties and alliances ==
=== United Progressive Alliance ===
Party	Flag	Symbol	Leader	Seats contested
Indian National Congress			Okram Ibobi Singh	2

=== National Democratic Alliance ===
Party	Flag	Symbol	Leader	Seats contested
Bharatiya Janata Party			R. K. Ranjan Singh	1

=== Others ===
Party	flag	Symbol	leader	Seats contested
All India Trinamool Congress			Kim Gangte	2
Naga People's Front			Lorho S. Pfoze	1
Communist Party of India			Moirangthem Nara Singh	1
Nationalist Congress Party			Chungkhokai Doungel	1

== Opinion polling ==
Conducted in Month(s)	Ref	Polling Organisation/Agency	Sample size			
Conducted in Month(s)	Ref	Polling Organisation/Agency	Sample size	INC	BJP	Others
Aug–Oct 2013	!	Times Now-India TV-CVoter	24,284	2	0	0
Jan–Feb 2014		Times Now-India TV-CVoter	14,000	1	0	1

== Election schedule ==
The constituency-wise election schedule is given below –

Polling Day	Phase	Date	Constituencies	Voting Percentage
1	2	9 April	Outer Manipur	80
2	5	17 April	Inner Manipur	75

== Results ==
The results of the elections will be declared on 16 May 2014.

=== Results by Party ===
Party Name	Popular vote			Seats		
Party Name	Votes	%	±pp	Contested	Won	+/−
INC	5,88,872	41.69	▼1.27	2	2	Steady
NPF	2,81,133	19.90	New entry	1	0	Steady
CPI	1,97,428	13.98	▼0.95	1	0	Steady
BJP	1,68,272	11.91	▲2.42	2	0	Steady
NCP	61,662	4.37	▼1.59	1	0	Steady
AITC	52,655	3.73	New entry	2	0	Steady
AAP	7,604	0.54	New entry	2	0	Steady
JD(U)	1,085	0.08	New entry	1	0	Steady
Others	3,407	0.24	Steady	2	0	Steady
IND	43,013	3.04	▲1.31	4	0	Steady
NOTA	7,504	0.53	Steady			
Total	14,12,636	100%	-	18	2	-

=== Constituency wise ===
Constituency		Winner				Runner-up				Margin	
Constituency		Candidate	Party	Votes	%	Candidate	Party	Votes	%	Votes	%
1	Inner Manipur	Thokchom Meinya	INC	2,92,102	45.58	Moirangthem Nara	CPI	1,97,428	30.81	94,678	14.77
2	Outer Manipur	Thangso Baite	INC	2,96,770	38.45	Soso Lorho	NPF	2,81,121	36.43	15,637	2.03

== Assembly segments wise lead of Parties ==
Party	Assembly segments	Position in Assembly (as of 2017 elections)
Indian National Congress	38	28
Naga People's Front	9	4
Communist Party of India	9	0
Bharatiya Janata Party	3	21
All India Trinamool Congress	1	1
Others	0	6
Total	60	

=== Constituency Wise Results ===
Constituency		Winner			Runner-up			Margin
#	Name	Candidate	Party	Votes	Candidate	Party	Votes	Margin
Inner Manipur Lok Sabha constituency
1	Khundrakpam	Thokchom Meinya	INC	11,809	Moirangthem Nara	CPI	3,761	8,048
2	Heingang	Thokchom Meinya	INC	10,372	R.K. Ranjan Singh	BJP	4,764	5,608
3	Khurai	Thokchom Meinya	INC	9,863	Moirangthem Nara	CPI	5,696	4,167
4	Kshetrigao	Thokchom Meinya	INC	12,043	Moirangthem Nara	CPI	7,168	4,875
5	Thongju	Moirangthem Nara	CPI	8,043	R.K. Ranjan Singh	BJP	6,701	1,342
6	Keirao	Thokchom Meinya	INC	10,743	Moirangthem Nara	CPI	5,479	5,264
7	Andro	Sarangthem Manaobi	AITC	13,297	Thokchom Meinya	INC	5,847	7,450
8	Lamlai	Thokchom Meinya	INC	9,339	Moirangthem Nara	CPI	5,433	3,906
9	Thangmeiband	R.K. Ranjan Singh	BJP	6,582	Thokchom Meinya	INC	6,279	303
10	Uripok	Moirangthem Nara	CPI	6,047	Thokchom Meinya	INC	4,738	1,309
11	Sagolband	Moirangthem Nara	CPI	6,689	Thokchom Meinya	INC	5,308	1,381
12	Keishamthong	Moirangthem Nara	CPI	9,421	Thokchom Meinya	INC	3,793	5,628
13	Singjamei	Moirangthem Nara	CPI	6,718	Thokchom Meinya	INC	3,348	3,370
14	Yaiskul	Thokchom Meinya	INC	5,916	Moirangthem Nara	CPI	5,572	344
15	Wangkhei	Thokchom Meinya	INC	7,497	Moirangthem Nara	CPI	7,086	411
16	Sekmai (SC)	Thokchom Meinya	INC	6,556	R.K. Ranjan Singh	BJP	4,218	2,338
17	Lamsang	Thokchom Meinya	INC	9,138	Moirangthem Nara	CPI	6,018	3,120
18	Konthoujam	Moirangthem Nara	CPI	9,560	Thokchom Meinya	INC	7,720	1,840
19	Patsoi	Thokchom Meinya	INC	10,963	Moirangthem Nara	CPI	7,573	3,390
20	Langthabal	Moirangthem Nara	CPI	9,121	Thokchom Meinya	INC	7,636	1,485
21	Naoriya Pakhanglakpa	Moirangthem Nara	CPI	10,938	Thokchom Meinya	INC	8,167	2,771
22	Wangoi	Moirangthem Nara	CPI	9,318	Thokchom Meinya	INC	6,905	2,413
23	Mayang Imphal	Thokchom Meinya	INC	13,817	Moirangthem Nara	CPI	5,680	8,137
24	Nambol	Thokchom Meinya	INC	13,650	R.K. Ranjan Singh	BJP	9,177	4,473
25	Oinam	Thokchom Meinya	INC	11,329	Moirangthem Nara	CPI	3,630	7,699
26	Bishnupur	Thokchom Meinya	INC	12,992	R.K. Ranjan Singh	BJP	4,876	8,116
27	Moirang	Thokchom Meinya	INC	11,041	Moirangthem Nara	CPI	7,595	3,446
28	Thanga	R.K. Ranjan Singh	BJP	4,372	Thokchom Meinya	INC	4,115	257
29	Kumbi	Thokchom Meinya	INC	10,319	Moirangthem Nara	CPI	4,892	5,427
30	Lilong	Thokchom Meinya	INC	14,420	Moirangthem Nara	CPI	9,335	5,085
31	Thoubal	Thokchom Meinya	INC	18,014	Moirangthem Nara	CPI	6,269	11,745
32	Wangkhem	Thokchom Meinya	INC	14,524	Moirangthem Nara	CPI	6,981	7,543
Outer Manipur Lok Sabha constituency
33	Heirok	Thangso Baite	INC	16,826	Gangmumei Kamei	BJP	3,264	13,562
34	Wangjing Tentha	Thangso Baite	INC	13,251	Gangmumei Kamei	BJP	4,525	8,726
35	Khangabok	Thangso Baite	INC	18,914	Gangmumei Kamei	BJP	7,980	10,934
36	Wabgai	Thangso Baite	INC	14,675	Gangmumei Kamei	BJP	3,754	10,921
37	Kakching	Thangso Baite	INC	10,338	Gangmumei Kamei	BJP	5,146	5,192
38	Hiyanglam	Thangso Baite	INC	9,270	Gangmumei Kamei	BJP	3,414	5,856
39	Sugnu	Thangso Baite	INC	12,626	Gangmumei Kamei	BJP	3,829	8,797
40	Jiribam	Thangso Baite	INC	10,220	Gangmumei Kamei	BJP	3,579	6,641
41	Chandel (ST)	Soso Lorho	NPF	18,205	Thangso Baite	INC	8,718	9,487
42	Tengnoupal (ST)	Soso Lorho	NPF	20,590	Thangso Baite	INC	15,705	4,885
43	Phungyar (ST)	Soso Lorho	NPF	17,336	Thangso Baite	INC	3,747	13,589
44	Ukhrul (ST)	Soso Lorho	NPF	21,031	Thangso Baite	INC	5,041	15,990
45	Chingai (ST)	Soso Lorho	NPF	30,891	Thangso Baite	INC	1,885	29,006
46	Saikul (ST)	Thangso Baite	INC	15,706	Chungkhokai Doungel	NCP	7,086	8,620
47	Karong (ST)	Soso Lorho	NPF	46,504	Thangso Baite	INC	1,275	45,229
48	Mao (ST)	Soso Lorho	NPF	46,605	Thangso Baite	INC	1,662	44,943
49	Tadubi (ST)	Soso Lorho	NPF	23,767	Thangso Baite	INC	11,831	11,936
50	Kangpokpi	Thangso Baite	INC	8,194	Mani Charenamei	IND	4,933	3,261
51	Saitu (ST)	Thangso Baite	INC	17,807	Soso Lorho	NPF	5,070	12,737
52	Tamei (ST)	Soso Lorho	NPF	12,708	Mani Charenamei	IND	5,615	7,093
53	Tamenglong (ST)	Gangmumei Kamei	BJP	8,190	Soso Lorho	NPF	6,056	2,134
54	Nungba (ST)	Thangso Baite	INC	9,512	Gangmumei Kamei	BJP	7,322	2,190
55	Tipaimukh (ST)	Thangso Baite	INC	10,637	Gangmumei Kamei	BJP	728	9,909
56	Thanlon (ST)	Thangso Baite	INC	12,263	Soso Lorho	NPF	2,134	10,129
57	Henglep (ST)	Thangso Baite	INC	10,747	Chungkhokai Doungel	NCP	4,965	5,782
58	Churachandpur (ST)	Thangso Baite	INC	14,501	Soso Lorho	NPF	7,959	6,542
59	Saikot (ST)	Thangso Baite	INC	17,547	Chungkhokai Doungel	NCP	11,272	6,275
60	Singhat (ST)	Thangso Baite	INC	13,389	Chungkhokai Doungel	NCP	2,630	10,759
