= 2004 Indian general election in Manipur =

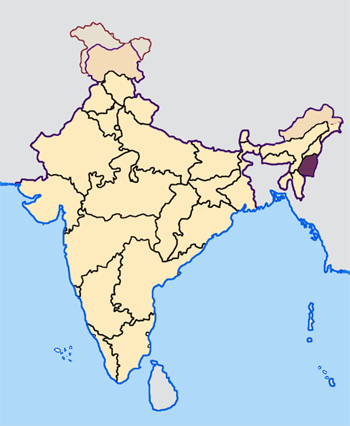
Manipur

2004 Indian general election in Manipur describes the results of the 2004 Indian federal election in the state of Manipur. The Bharatiya Janata Party received the most seats in the election with 20.65% of the vote.

== Schedule ==
The schedule of the election was announced by the Election Commission of India on 29 February 2004.

Poll event	Phase	
Poll event	1	2
Date of announcement	29 February 2004	
Notification date	24 March 2004	31 March 2004
Last date for filing nomination	31 March 2004	7 April 2004
Scrutiny of nomination	2 April 2004	8 April 2004
Last date for withdrawal of nomination	5 April 2004	10 April 2004
Date of poll	20 April 2004	26 April 2004
Date of counting of votes	13 May 2004	
No. of constituencies	1	1

== Parties and Alliances ==
Party	Flag	Symbol	Leader	Seats contested
Indian National Congress			Thokchom Meinya	1
Nationalist Congress Party			Holkhomang Haokip	1
Bharatiya Janata Party			Thounaojam Chaoba Singh; D. Loli Adanee	2
All India Trinamool Congress			W Morung Makunga	1
Communist Party of India			Moirangthem Nara	1
Janata Dal (United)			Rosangzuala	1
Manipur Peoples Party			Kim Gangte	1
Federal Party of Manipur			Leishangthem Chandrama	1

== Results by constituency ==
=== Results by Party/Alliance ===
Party Name	Popular vote			Seats		
Party Name	Votes	%	±pp	Contested	Won	+/−
BJP	2,13,892	20.65	▲19.63	2	0	Steady
INC	1,54,055	14.88	▼10.41	1	1	▲1
NCP	1,07,435	10.37	▼3.12	1	0	▼1
CPI	1,04,722	10.11	▲6.16	1	0	Steady
FPM	88,179	8.52	▲5.16	1	0	Steady
MPP	77,055	7.44	Steady	1	0	Steady
JD(U)	37,455	3.62	▲0.43	1	0	Steady
AITC	20,131	1.94	Steady	1	0	Steady
IND	2,32,633	22.46	▲15.83	3	1	▲1
Total	10,35,557	100%	-	12	2	-

=== Detailed Constituency ===
Constituency		Winner				Runner-up				Margin	
Constituency		Candidate	Party	Votes	%	Candidate	Party	Votes	%	Votes	%
1	Inner Manipur	Thokchom Meinya	INC	1,54,055	37.00	Moirangthem Nara	CPI	1,04,722	25.15	49,333	11.85
2	Outer Manipur	Mani Charenamei	IND	2,29,634	37.09	D. Loli Adanee	BJP	1,47,441	23.81	82,193	13.28

== Assembly Seat wise leads ==
=== Inner Manipur Lok Sabha constituency ===
Constituency		Winner			Runner-up			Margin
#	Name	Candidate	Party	Votes	Candidate	Party	Votes	Margin
1	Khundrakpam	Moirangthem Nara	CPI	4,928	Thokchom Meinya	INC	3,934	994
2	Heingang	Thokchom Meinya	INC	6,379	Thounaojam Chaoba	BJP	4,730	1,649
3	Khurai	Moirangthem Nara	CPI	5,103	Leishangthem Chandrama	FPM	4,689	414
4	Khetrigao	Moirangthem Nara	CPI	6,218	Thokchom Meinya	INC	4,709	1,509
5	Thongju	Thokchom Meinya	INC	5,948	Thounaojam Chaoba	BJP	3,074	2,874
6	Keirao	Thokchom Meinya	INC	7,606	Leishangthem Chandrama	FPM	3,838	3,768
7	Andro	Thokchom Meinya	INC	7,832	Leishangthem Chandrama	FPM	3,464	4,368
8	Lamlai	Moirangthem Nara	CPI	5,688	Leishangthem Chandrama	FPM	4,759	929
9	Thangmeiband	Thounaojam Chaoba	BJP	2,315	Thokchom Meinya	INC	1,800	515
10	Uripok	Moirangthem Nara	CPI	2,244	Thokchom Meinya	INC	1,332	912
11	Sagolband	Leishangthem Chandrama	FPM	2,812	Thokchom Meinya	INC	2,694	118
12	Keisamthong	Thokchom Meinya	INC	2,935	Moirangthem Nara	CPI	2,868	67
13	Singjamei	Moirangthem Nara	CPI	2,491	Leishangthem Chandrama	FPM	2,299	192
14	Yaiskul	Moirangthem Nara	CPI	1,885	Leishangthem Chandrama	FPM	1,466	419
15	Wangkhei	Thokchom Meinya	INC	4,395	Leishangthem Chandrama	FPM	3,288	1,107
16	Sekmai	Leishangthem Chandrama	FPM	3,551	Thounaojam Chaoba	BJP	2,435	1,116
17	Lamsang	Thokchom Meinya	INC	8,222	Leishangthem Chandrama	FPM	4,417	3,805
18	Konthoujam	Thokchom Meinya	INC	12,977	Thounaojam Chaoba	BJP	2,788	10,189
19	Patsoi	Leishangthem Chandrama	FPM	6,778	Moirangthem Nara	CPI	4,585	2,193
20	Langthabal	Leishangthem Chandrama	FPM	3,625	Thokchom Meinya	INC	3,000	625
21	Naoriya Pakhanglakpa	Moirangthem Nara	CPI	4,189	Thounaojam Chaoba	BJP	3,861	328
22	Wangoi	Thokchom Meinya	INC	8,103	Leishangthem Chandrama	FPM	4,883	3,220
23	Mayang Imphal	Thokchom Meinya	INC	4,790	Leishangthem Chandrama	FPM	3,157	1,633
24	Nambol	Thokchom Meinya	INC	9,263	Thounaojam Chaoba	BJP	8,898	365
25	Oinam	Thounaojam Chaoba	BJP	2,766	Thokchom Meinya	INC	2,578	188
26	Bishenpur	Thokchom Meinya	INC	8,665	Thounaojam Chaoba	BJP	4,914	3,751
27	Moirang	Thokchom Meinya	INC	5,256	Moirangthem Nara	CPI	4,795	461
28	Thanga	Thokchom Meinya	INC	2,759	Leishangthem Chandrama	FPM	2,744	15
29	Kumbi	Moirangthem Nara	CPI	3,726	Thounaojam Chaoba	BJP	1,116	2,610
30	Lilong	Thokchom Meinya	INC	6,854	Moirangthem Nara	CPI	4,903	1,951
31	Thoubal	Thokchom Meinya	INC	10,537	Moirangthem Nara	CPI	5,811	4,726
32	Wangkhem	Moirangthem Nara	CPI	7,481	Thokchom Meinya	INC	5,198	2,283

=== Outer Manipur Lok Sabha constituency ===
Constituency		Winner			Runner-up			Margin
#	Name	Candidate	Party	Votes	Candidate	Party	Votes	Margin
33	Heirok	Kim Gangte	MPP	4,170	Holkhomang Haokip	NCP	1,798	2,372
34	Wangjing Tentha	Holkhomang Haokip	NCP	5,002	W Morung Makunga	AITC	1,057	3,945
35	Khangabo	Holkhomang Haokip	NCP	12,001	Kim Gangte	MPP	2,031	9,970
36	Wabgai	Holkhomang Haokip	NCP	7,056	Kim Gangte	MPP	845	6,211
37	Kakching	Kim Gangte	MPP	1,459	D. Loli Adanee	BJP	1,248	211
38	Hiyanglam	Holkhomang Haokip	NCP	2,984	Kim Gangte	MPP	1,650	1,334
39	Sugnuo	Holkhomang Haokip	NCP	2,139	Kim Gangte	MPP	1,633	506
40	Jiribam	D. Loli Adanee	BJP	3,220	Holkhomang Haokip	NCP	1,119	2,101
41	Chandel	Mani Charenamei	IND	21,116	Holkhomang Haokip	NCP	9,959	11,157
42	Tengnoupal	Holkhomang Haokip	NCP	14,760	Mani Charenamei	IND	9,705	5,055
43	Phungyar	Mani Charenamei	IND	8,188	D. Loli Adanee	BJP	7,639	549
44	Ukhrul	Mani Charenamei	IND	15,081	D. Loli Adanee	BJP	7,786	7,295
45	Chingai	Mani Charenamei	IND	21,324	D. Loli Adanee	BJP	6,236	15,088
46	Saikul	Holkhomang Haokip	NCP	10,980	Kim Gangte	MPP	7,051	3,929
47	Karong	Mani Charenamei	IND	32,341	D. Loli Adanee	BJP	8,443	23,898
48	Mao	Mani Charenamei	IND	23,520	D. Loli Adanee	BJP	20,651	2,869
49	Tadubi	Mani Charenamei	IND	16,342	D. Loli Adanee	BJP	14,348	1,994
50	Kangpokpi	Rosangzuala	JD(U)	11,949	Mani Charenamei	IND	9,264	2,685
51	Saitu	Rosangzuala	JD(U)	12,193	Mani Charenamei	IND	8,559	3,634
52	Tamei	Mani Charenamei	IND	21,162	D. Loli Adanee	BJP	2,112	19,050
53	Tamenglong	Mani Charenamei	IND	18,361	D. Loli Adanee	BJP	1,854	16,507
54	Nungba	Mani Charenamei	IND	14,247	D. Loli Adanee	BJP	1,570	12,677
55	Tipaimukh	Kim Gangte	MPP	12,694	Holkhomang Haokip	NCP	627	12,067
56	Thanlon	D. Loli Adanee	BJP	14,172	Kim Gangte	MPP	1,565	12,607
57	Henglep	Kim Gangte	MPP	9,178	Holkhomang Haokip	NCP	3,591	5,587
58	Churachandpur	D. Loli Adanee	BJP	20,970	Kim Gangte	MPP	5,105	15,865
59	Saikot	Holkhomang Haokip	NCP	13,577	Kim Gangte	MPP	12,776	801
60	Singhat	D. Loli Adanee	BJP	13,920	Holkhomang Haokip	NCP	4,951	8,969

=== Assembly segments wise lead of Parties ===
Party	Assembly segments
Indian National Congress	16
Independent	10
Communist Party of India	10
Nationalist Congress Party	8
Bharatiya Janata Party	6
Federal Party of Manipur	4
Manipur People's Party	4
Janata Dal (United)	2
Total	60
