= 2009 Indian general election in Manipur =

- 16 – 22 April 2009

2 seats
- Turnout: 77.31%
	First party
	UPA
Party	UPA
Seats won	2
Seat change	▲1
Percentage	42.96%
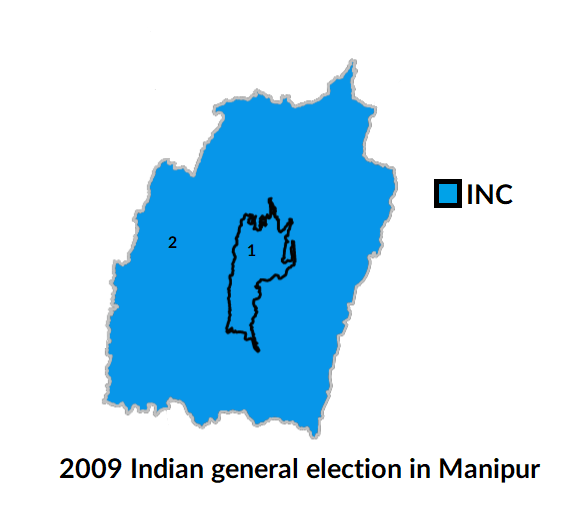
- 2009 Indian general election in Manipur
Prime Minister before election
Manmohan Singh
INC
Prime Minister after election
Manmohan Singh
INC

The 2009 Indian general election in Manipur, occurred for 2 seats in the state.

Candidates of the Indian National Congress triumphed in the election to both the Parliamentary constituencies with Dr Thokchom Meinya Singh retaining the Inner seat and Thangso Baite wresting the Outer Parliamentary seat from Mani Charenamei of the People's Democratic Alliance. After completion of counting of votes cast by the electorates of Manipur in the 15th Lok Sabha elections, Dr Meinya defeated his nearest rival Dr Moirangthem Nara Singh of CPI by 40,960 votes with Thangso Baite favoured by 344,517 voters compared to 224,719 votes cast for Charenamei. Thangso Baite's victory margin by 119,798 votes over Charenamei is also more than the figure of defeat suffered by the Congress candidate to the same rival in the previous poll.

== Parties and alliances ==
=== United Progressive Alliance ===
Party	Flag	Symbol	Leader	Seats contested
Indian National Congress			Okram Ibobi Singh	2

=== National Democratic Alliance ===
Party	Flag	Symbol	Leader	Seats contested
Bharatiya Janata Party			R. K. Ranjan Singh	2

== Results ==
=== Results by Party ===
Party Name	Popular vote			Seats		
Party Name	Votes	%	±pp	Contested	Won	+/−
INC	5,75,393	42.96	▲28.08	2	2	▲1
PDA	2,24,719	16.78	New entry	1	0	Steady
CPI	1,99,916	14.93	▲4.82	1	0	Steady
BJP	1,27,146	9.49	▼11.16	2	0	Steady
MPP	1,01,787	7.60	▲0.16	1	0	Steady
NCP	79,849	5.96	▼4.41	1	0	Steady
RJD	4,859	0.36	New entry	1	0	Steady
LJP	1,252	0.09	New entry	1	0	Steady
RBCP	1,290	0.10	New entry	1	0	Steady
IND	23,188	1.73	▼20.73	5	0	▼1
Total	13,39,399	100%	-	16	2	-

=== Constituency wise ===
Constituency		Winner				Runner-up				Margin	
Constituency		Candidate	Party	Votes	%	Candidate	Party	Votes	%	Votes	%
1	Inner Manipur	Dr. Thokchom Meinya	INC	230,876	39.59	Moirangthem Nara	CPI	199,916	34.28	30,960	5.31
2	Outer Manipur	Thangso Baite	INC	344,517	45.56	Mani Charenamei	PDA	224,719	29.72	119,798	15.84

== Assembly Seat wise leads ==
Constituency		Winner			Runner-up			Margin
#	Name	Candidate	Party	Votes	Candidate	Party	Votes	Margin
Inner Manipur Lok Sabha constituency
1	Khundrakpam	Thokchom Meinya	INC	10,393	Moirangthem Nara	CPI	4,575	5,818
2	Heingang	Thokchom Meinya	INC	7,930	Moirangthem Nara	CPI	6,013	1,917
3	Khurai	Moirangthem Nara	CPI	6,504	Thokchom Meinya	INC	5,671	833
4	Kshetrigao	Moirangthem Nara	CPI	9,745	Thokchom Meinya	INC	7,670	2,075
5	Thongju	Moirangthem Nara	CPI	10,142	Thokchom Meinya	INC	5,143	4,999
6	Keirao	Thokchom Meinya	INC	8,326	Moirangthem Nara	CPI	6,790	1,536
7	Andro	Thokchom Meinya	INC	16,280	Moirangthem Nara	CPI	4,277	12,003
8	Lamlai	Moirangthem Nara	CPI	8,338	Thokchom Meinya	INC	6,438	1,900
9	Thangmeiband	Thokchom Meinya	INC	4,954	Moirangthem Nara	CPI	4,095	859
10	Uripok	Moirangthem Nara	CPI	5,753	Thokchom Meinya	INC	3,873	1,880
11	Sagolband	Thokchom Meinya	INC	5,965	Moirangthem Nara	CPI	4,924	1,041
12	Keishamthong	Thokchom Meinya	INC	7,904	Moirangthem Nara	CPI	6,638	1,266
13	Singjamei	Moirangthem Nara	CPI	6,656	Thokchom Meinya	INC	2,626	4,030
14	Yaiskul	Moirangthem Nara	CPI	5,909	Thokchom Meinya	INC	3,827	2,082
15	Wangkhei	Thokchom Meinya	INC	7,932	Moirangthem Nara	CPI	6,919	1,013
16	Sekmai (ST)	Moirangthem Nara	CPI	5,956	Thokchom Meinya	INC	4,275	1,681
17	Lamsang	Thokchom Meinya	INC	8,055	Moirangthem Nara	CPI	6,849	1,206
18	Konthoujam	Thokchom Meinya	INC	7,149	Moirangthem Nara	CPI	5,527	1,622
19	Patsoi	Thokchom Meinya	INC	7,293	Moirangthem Nara	CPI	7,227	66
20	Langthabal	Moirangthem Nara	CPI	6,341	Thounaojam Chaoba	MPP	5,817	524
21	Naoriya Pakhanglakpa	Moirangthem Nara	CPI	7,610	Thounaojam Chaoba	MPP	6,379	1,231
22	Wangoi	Thokchom Meinya	INC	7,834	Wahengbam; Nipamacha Singh	BJP	6,992	842
23	Mayang Imphal	Thokchom Meinya	INC	8,766	Moirangthem Nara	CPI	4,861	3,905
24	Nambol	Thounaojam Chaoba	MPP	10,988	Thokchom Meinya	INC	10,386	602
25	Oinam	Thounaojam Chaoba	MPP	8,571	Thokchom Meinya	INC	5,336	3,235
26	Bishnupur	Thokchom Meinya	INC	11,217	Thounaojam Chaoba	MPP	5,525	5,692
27	Moirang	Thokchom Meinya	INC	7,877	Moirangthem Nara	CPI	6,436	1,441
28	Thanga	Thokchom Meinya	INC	4,439	Moirangthem Nara	CPI	4,403	36
29	Kumbi	Moirangthem Nara	CPI	7,274	Thokchom Meinya	INC	4,877	2,397
30	Lilong	Moirangthem Nara	CPI	10,898	Thokchom Meinya	INC	6,477	4,421
31	Thoubal	Thokchom Meinya	INC	16,136	Moirangthem Nara	CPI	6,828	9,308
32	Wangkhem	Moirangthem Nara	CPI	10,119	Thokchom Meinya	INC	6,717	3,402
Outer Manipur Lok Sabha constituency
33	Heirok	Thangso Baite	INC	14,563	L. B. Sona	NCP	2,479	12,084
34	Wangjing Tentha	Thangso Baite	INC	16,168	L. B. Sona	NCP	3,074	13,094
35	Khangabok	Thangso Baite	INC	23,002	L. B. Sona	NCP	1,503	21,499
36	Wabgai	Thangso Baite	INC	15,534	L. B. Sona	NCP	1,514	14,020
37	Kakching	Thangso Baite	INC	14,990	L. B. Sona	NCP	1,739	13,251
38	Hiyanglam	Thangso Baite	INC	9,146	L. B. Sona	NCP	4,110	5,036
39	Sugnu	Thangso Baite	INC	14,201	L. B. Sona	NCP	2,594	11,607
40	Jiribam	Thangso Baite	INC	8,958	L. B. Sona	NCP	2,255	6,703
41	Chandel (ST)	Thangso Baite	INC	19,888	Mani Charenamei	PDA	18,633	1,255
42	Tengnoupal (ST)	Thangso Baite	INC	26,952	Mani Charenamei	PDA	15,607	11,345
43	Phungyar (ST)	Mani Charenamei	PDA	12,523	D. Loli Adanee	BJP	4,199	8,324
44	Ukhrul (ST)	Mani Charenamei	PDA	15,958	D. Loli Adanee	BJP	6,575	9,383
45	Chingai (ST)	Mani Charenamei	PDA	22,194	D. Loli Adanee	BJP	5,021	17,173
46	Saikul (ST)	Thangso Baite	INC	27,516	Mani Charenamei	PDA	3,610	23,906
47	Karong (ST)	Mani Charenamei	PDA	17,443	D. Loli Adanee	BJP	12,281	5,162
48	Mao (ST)	D. Loli Adanee	BJP	23,317	Mani Charenamei	PDA	21,330	1,987
49	Tadubi (ST)	Mani Charenamei	PDA	18,039	D. Loli Adanee	BJP	13,295	4,744
50	Kangpokpi (ST)	Thangso Baite	INC	11,060	Mani Charenamei	PDA	9,445	1,615
51	Saitu (ST)	Thangso Baite	INC	23,336	Mani Charenamei	PDA	9,299	14,037
52	Tamei (ST)	Mani Charenamei	PDA	18,815	Thangso Baite	INC	5,905	12,910
53	Tamenglong (ST)	Mani Charenamei	PDA	16,046	Thangso Baite	INC	3,723	12,323
54	Nungba (ST)	Thangso Baite	INC	9,050	Mani Charenamei	PDA	4,770	4,280
55	Tipaimukh (ST)	Mani Charenamei	PDA	8,794	Thangso Baite	INC	1,988	6,806
56	Thanlon (ST)	L. B. Sona	NCP	13,004	Thangso Baite	INC	1,506	11,498
57	Henglep (ST)	Thangso Baite	INC	19,829	L. B. Sona	NCP	1,911	17,918
58	Churachandpur (ST)	L. B. Sona	NCP	24,536	Thangso Baite	INC	9,735	14,801
59	Saikot (ST)	Thangso Baite	INC	30,290	L. B. Sona	NCP	3,826	26,464
60	Singhat (ST)	L. B. Sona	NCP	12,899	Thangso Baite	INC	8,998	3,901

== Assembly segments wise lead of Parties ==
Party	Assembly segments	Position in Assembly (as of 2012 elections)
Indian National Congress	33	42
Communist Party of India	13	0
People's Democratic Alliance	8	0
Nationalist Congress Party	3	1
Manipur Peoples Party	2	0
Bharatiya Janata Party	1	0
Others	0	17
Total	60	

== Details ==
=== Inner manipur parliamentary Constituency ===
Out of the 32 assembly segments in the Inner Manipur Parliamentary constituency, Dr Meinya received maximum mandate of 16,280 votes out of the total strength of 22,726 electors in Andro assembly constituency whereas 16,136 voters of Thoubal AC stamped their approval to the eventual winner. The third highest votes gained by the Congress MP was in Khundrakpam AC where 10,393 voted in his favour. Dr Meinya, who elicited significant support in all the 32 assembly segments got the fewest 2626 votes from the electorates of Singjamei AC. The Congress candidate had won the same parliamentary seat in the previous Lok Sabha election (2004) with a victory margin of a little over 49,000. Dr nara was the nearest rival at that time, too. In the recent hustings, Dr Nara generated fair support in all the assembly segments where the average voting trend was over the 3000 mark with the exception of Nambol AC where he was preferred by only 1618 adults. Maximum number of Nambol electorates favoured former Parliamentarian Thounaojam Chaoba Singh. Chaoba who contested the 15th Lok Sabha election on MPP ticket polled 10,988 votes. The figure, in his home polling station, was also the most chaoba polled in the election. In spite of being the consensus candidate of a handful of national as well as regional political parties Chaoba finished a distant third tipping the one lakh barrier by only 1787 votes. Out of the total of 199,916 votes polled by Dr Nara, the CPI stalwart received maximum support of Lilong AC electorates with 10,898 from a total of 21,451 votes favouring the former Art and Culture Minister. Mandate of Thongju AC electorates too tilted heavily in favour of Dr Nara with 10,142 votes cast for the CPI nominee out of the total of 18,210. Election to the Inner Manipur parliamentary constituency for the 15th Lok Sabha was held on 22 April with a total of seven candidates in the fray. Former Chief Minister and BJP nominee W Nipamacha, L Kshetrani devi (RBCP), Abdul Rahman (Independent) and N Homendro (Ind) were the other candidates. Dr Meinya also led in all the four districts where franchise for the inner Parliamentary Constituency was conducted. The difference of victory margin between Dr Meinya and Dr Nara was the largest in Imphal East district with 10,298 votes separating the winner and nearest vanquished. On the other hand, Imphal West witnessed the fiercest contest between the two as the difference stood at only 2144 votes.

=== Outer Manipur Parliamentary constituency ===
Out of 28 assembly segments in the Outer seat, Thangso Baite received mandate of 344,517 voters to represent them in the Parliament. Outer Parliamentary Constituency is also composed of six assembly segments of Thoubal district and Jiribam subdivision of Imphal East district, and Scheduled Tribe assembly segments spread across Tamenglong, Chandel, Ukhrul, Senapati and Churachandpur districts. Thangso, who faltered against Mani Charenamei in the 14th Lok Sabha election by 82,193 votes secured the maximum of 27,516 votes from electorates of Saikul AC against 15,607 for Charenamei in the 15th Lok Sabha election. Compared to his nearest rival, Thangso was least influential among Mao AC electors where only 850 votes were polled for the INC candidate. On the other hand, the sitting MP was heavily favoured by the electors of Chingai AC in Ukhrul district as the maximum of 22,194 votes were cast for the PDA nominee. The least vote Charenamei managed from among the 28 assembly segments was in Sugnu AC under Thoubal district with only 106 voters choosing the PDA candidate. The INC candidate had substantial lead in 17 of the ACs whereas Charenamei led in eight, LB sona of the Nationalist Congress Party in two and Loli Adanee of the BJP in one. Election for the Outer Manipur Parliamentary (ST) Constituency was held on 16 April with a total of nine candidates in the fray. The other candidates are BJP's D Loli Adanee (93,052), NCP's LB Sona (79,849), RJD's MY Haokip (4859), LJP's Thangkhagin (1252), Valley Rose (Ind/4735), M Rose Haokip (Ind/1128) and L Gangte (Ind/2070).
