= 2019 Indian general election in Manipur =

Indian lower house poll in Manipur

- 11,18 April 2019

2 seats
- Turnout: 82.69% (▲2.94%)

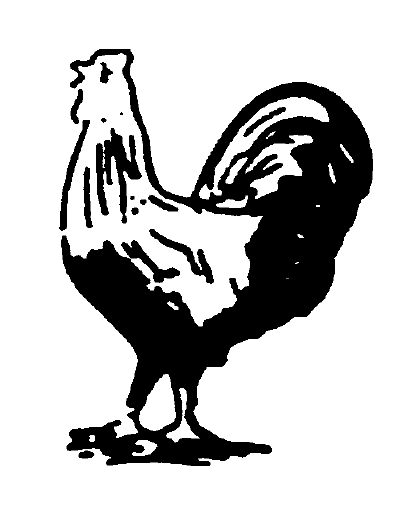

	First party	Second party
Party	BJP	NPF
Alliance	NDA	-
Last election	0	0
Seats won	1	1
Seat change	▲1	▲1
Percentage	34.33%	22.55%
Swing	▲22.53%	▲5.94%
	Third party	Fourth party
Party	INC	CPI
Alliance	UPA	-
Last election	2	0
Seats won	0	0
Seat change	▼2	Steady
Percentage	24.71%	8.3%
Swing	▼16.81%	-
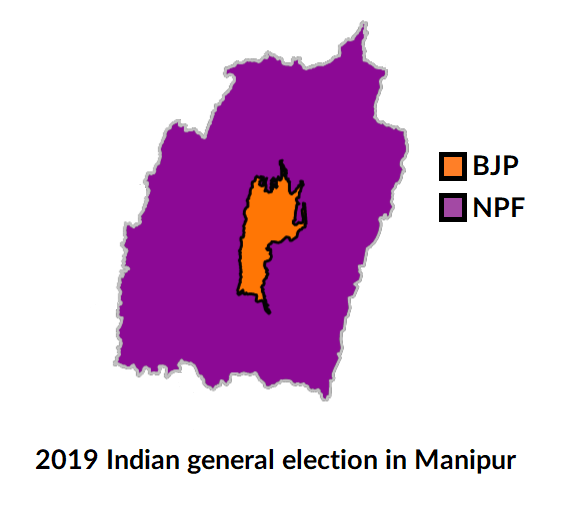
- 2019 Indian general election in Manipur
Prime Minister before election
Narendra Modi
BJP
Prime Minister after election
Narendra Modi
BJP

The 2019 Indian general election in Manipur for two Lok Sabha seats was held in two phases on 11 – 18 April 2019. Voters turnout in first phase was 84.21% and the second phase was 81.16%

== Parties and alliances ==
=== National Democratic Alliance ===
Party	Flag	Symbol	Leader	Seats contested
Bharatiya Janata Party			N. Biren Singh	1

=== United Progressive Alliance ===
Party	Flag	Symbol	Leader	Seats contested
Indian National Congress			Okram Ibobi Singh	2

=== Others ===
Party	flag	Symbol	leader	Seats contested
Naga People's Front			Lorho S. Pfoze	1
Communist Party of India			Moirangthem Nara Singh	1

== Candidates ==
Constituency							
Constituency		NDA		UPA		Others	
1	Inner Manipur	BJP	Rajkumar Ranjan Singh	INC	Oinam Nabakishore Singh	CPI	Moirangthem Nara
2	Outer Manipur	BJP	H Shokhopao Mate (Benjamin)	INC	K James	NPF	Lorho S. Pfoze

== Result ==
=== Party wise ===
Party Name	Popular vote			Seats		
Party Name	Votes	%	±pp	Contested	Won	+/−
BJP	5,53,377	34.22	▲22.31	2	1	▲1
INC	3,98,387	24.63	▼17.06	2	0	▼2
NPF	3,63,527	22.48	▲2.58	1	1	▲1
CPI	1,33,813	8.27	▼5.71	1	0	Steady
Others	77,272	4.78	Steady	8	0	Steady
IND	85,565	5.29	▲2.25	5	0	Steady
NOTA	5,389	0.33	▼0.02	2	Steady	Steady
Total	16,17,330	100%	-	19	2	-

=== Constituency wise ===
Constituency		Winner				Runner-up				Margin	
Constituency		Candidate	Party	Votes	%	Candidate	Party	Votes	%	Votes	%
1	Inner Manipur	Dr Rajkumar Ranjan Singh	BJP	263,632	34.67	Oinam Nabakishore Singh	INC	245,877	32.33	17,755	2.34
2	Outer Manipur	Lorho S. Pfoze	NPF	363,527	42.27	Houlim Shokhopao Mate	BJP	289,745	33.69	73,782	8.58

== Post-election Union Council of Ministers from Manipur ==
#	Name	Constituency	Designation	Department	From	To	Party
1	Rajkumar Ranjan Singh	Inner Manipur	MoS	Ministry of Education; Ministry of External Affairs	7 July 2021	9 June 2024	BJP

== Assembly segments wise lead of Parties ==

Party	Assembly segments	Position in Assembly (as of 2022 elections)
Bharatiya Janata Party	26	32
Indian National Congress	20	5
Naga People's Front	11	5
National People's Party	0	7
Communist Party of India	3	0
Others	3	3
Total	60	

=== Constituency wise ===
Constituency		Winner			Runner-up			Margin
#	Name	Candidate	Party	Votes	Candidate	Party	Votes	Margin
Inner Manipur Lok Sabha constituency
1	Khundrakpam (GEN)	Oinam Nabakishore	INC	8,739	R.K. Ranjan Singh	BJP	7,195	1,544
2	Heingang (GEN)	R.K. Ranjan Singh	BJP	20,176	Oinam Nabakishore	INC	4,526	15,650
3	Khurai (GEN)	R.K. Ranjan Singh	BJP	8,632	Oinam Nabakishore	INC	6,446	2,186
4	Kshetrigao	Oinam Nabakishore	INC	9,180	Moirangthem Nara	CPI	7,598	1,582
5	Thongju	R.K. Ranjan Singh	BJP	13,764	Moirangthem Nara	CPI	4,764	9,000
6	Keirao	Oinam Nabakishore	INC	10,240	R.K. Ranjan Singh	BJP	9,258	982
7	Andro	R.K. Ranjan Singh	BJP	16,509	Oinam Nabakishore	INC	9,835	6,674
8	Lamlai	Moirangthem Nara	CPI	6,775	R.K. Ranjan Singh	BJP	6,334	441
9	Thangmeiband	R.K. Ranjan Singh	BJP	6,161	Oinam Nabakishore	INC	5,232	929
10	Uripok	Moirangthem Nara	CPI	7,032	R.K. Ranjan Singh	BJP	3,583	3,449
11	Sagolband	R.K. Ranjan Singh	BJP	5,358	Moirangthem Nara	CPI	4,994	364
12	Keishamthong	Moirangthem Nara	CPI	7,693	Oinam Nabakishore	INC	5,230	2,463
13	Singjamei	R.K. Ranjan Singh	BJP	6,161	Moirangthem Nara	CPI	5,989	172
14	Yaiskul	R.K. Ranjan Singh	BJP	7,025	Moirangthem Nara	CPI	5,529	1,496
15	Wangkhei	Oinam Nabakishore	INC	10,773	R.K. Ranjan Singh	BJP	7,952	2,821
16	Sekmai	R.K. Ranjan Singh	BJP	9,139	Oinam Nabakishore	INC	4,805	4,334
17	Lamsang	R.K. Ranjan Singh	BJP	11,026	Oinam Nabakishore	INC	7,629	3,397
18	Konthoujam	R.K. Ranjan Singh	BJP	11,322	Moirangthem Nara	CPI	3,561	7,761
19	Patsoi	Oinam Nabakishore	INC	9,235	Moirangthem Nara	CPI	6,937	2,298
20	Langthabal	R.K. Ranjan Singh	BJP	8,930	Oinam Nabakishore	INC	5,705	3,225
21	Naoriya Pakhanglakpa	R.K. Ranjan Singh	BJP	9,352	Oinam Nabakishore	INC	7,009	2,343
22	Wangoi	R.K. Ranjan Singh	BJP	8,662	Oinam Nabakishore	INC	7,874	788
23	Mayang Imphal	Oinam Nabakishore	INC	10,947	R.K. Ranjan Singh	BJP	8,516	2,431
24	Nambol	Oinam Nabakishore	INC	12,444	R.K. Ranjan Singh	BJP	10,950	1,494
25	Oinam	R.K. Ranjan Singh	BJP	7,384	R. K. Anand	NEIDP	3,766	3,618
26	Bishenpur	Oinam Nabakishore	INC	9,033	R.K. Ranjan Singh	BJP	8,360	673
27	Moirang	Oinam Nabakishore	INC	12,450	R.K. Ranjan Singh	BJP	7,526	4,924
28	Thanga	R.K. Ranjan Singh	BJP	7,246	Oinam Nabakishore	INC	3,684	3,562
29	Kumbi	Oinam Nabakishore	INC	7,243	R.K. Ranjan Singh	BJP	5,328	1,915
30	Lilong	Oinam Nabakishore	INC	16,333	R.K. Ranjan Singh	BJP	5,838	10,495
31	Thoubal	Oinam Nabakishore	INC	16,124	R.K. Ranjan Singh	BJP	4,493	11,631
32	Wangkhem	Oinam Nabakishore	INC	13,479	Moirangthem Nara	CPI	5,713	7,766
Outer Manipur Lok Sabha constituency
33	Heirok	Houlim Shokhopao Mate	BJP	10,328	K. James	INC	9,994	334
34	Wangjing Tentha	K. James	INC	11,947	Houlim Shokhopao Mate	BJP	6,670	5,277
35	Khangabok	K. James	INC	20,279	Houlim Shokhopao Mate	BJP	8,449	11,830
36	Wabgai	K. James	INC	13,334	Houlim Shokhopao Mate	BJP	5,573	7,761
37	Kakching	Houlim Shokhopao Mate	BJP	8,433	K. James	INC	7,803	630
38	Hiyanglam	K. James	INC	7,999	Houlim Shokhopao Mate	BJP	7,482	517
39	Sugnu	K. James	INC	9,025	Houlim Shokhopao Mate	BJP	8,250	775
40	Jiribam	Houlim Shokhopao Mate	BJP	8,070	K. James	INC	7,545	525
41	Chandel (ST)	Lorho S. Pfoze	NPF	20,040	Houlim Shokhopao Mate	BJP	18,470	1,570
42	Tengnoupal (ST)	Lorho S. Pfoze	NPF	20,112	Houlim Shokhopao Mate	BJP	18,012	2,100
43	Phungyar (ST)	Lorho S. Pfoze	NPF	24,793	K. James	INC	2,074	22,719
44	Ukhrul (ST)	Lorho S. Pfoze	NPF	33,897	Houlim Shokhopao Mate	BJP	3,297	30,600
45	Chingai (ST)	Lorho S. Pfoze	NPF	38,037	K. James	INC	770	37,267
46	Saikul (ST)	Houlim Shokhopao Mate	BJP	21,629	Lorho S. Pfoze	NPF	6,347	15,282
47	Karong (ST)	Lorho S. Pfoze	NPF	46,088	Houlim Shokhopao Mate	BJP	2,482	43,606
48	Mao (ST)	Lorho S. Pfoze	NPF	50,013	K. James	INC	453	49,560
49	Tadubi (ST)	Lorho S. Pfoze	NPF	37,370	Houlim Shokhopao Mate	BJP	6,154	31,216
50	Kangpokpi (ST)	Houlim Shokhopao Mate	BJP	15,378	Lorho S. Pfoze	NPF	5,768	9,610
51	Saitu (ST)	Houlim Shokhopao Mate	BJP	25,337	Lorho S. Pfoze	NPF	9,717	15,620
52	Tamei (ST)	Lorho S. Pfoze	NPF	27,360	Houlim Shokhopao Mate	BJP	4,254	23,106
53	Tamenglong (ST)	Lorho S. Pfoze	NPF	15,889	Houlim Shokhopao Mate	BJP	8,739	7,150
54	Nungba (ST)	Lorho S. Pfoze	NPF	8,807	K. James	INC	7,562	1,245
55	Tipaimukh (ST)	K. James	INC	6,894	Houlim Shokhopao Mate	BJP	3,383	3,511
56	Thanlon (ST)	Houlim Shokhopao Mate	BJP	12,729	K. James	INC	2,504	10,225
57	Henglep (ST)	Houlim Shokhopao Mate	BJP	17,743	K. James	INC	3,373	14,370
58	Churachandpur (ST)	K. James	INC	12,453	Houlim Shokhopao Mate	BJP	8,704	3,749
59	Saikot (ST)	Houlim Shokhopao Mate	BJP	30,456	K. James	INC	9,926	20,530
60	Singhat (ST)	Houlim Shokhopao Mate	BJP	21,083	K. James	INC	1,796	19,287

s
