= Elections in Manipur =

List of elections in an Indian state

Elections in Manipur are conducted since 1952 to elect the members for Manipur Legislative Assembly and Lok Sabha. There are 60 assembly constituencies and 2 Lok Sabha constituencies.

== Assembly Elections ==
=== 1967 ===
Party	Votes	%	Seats
Indian National Congress	101,504	32.53	16
Samyukta Socialist Party	36,520	11.70	4
Communist Party of India	17,062	5.47	1
Praja Socialist Party	2,417	0.77	0
Communist Party of India (Marxist)	2,093	0.67	0
Independents	152,419	48.85	9
Total	312,015	100.00	30
Valid votes	312,015	82.00	
Invalid/blank votes	68,505	18.00	
Total votes	380,520	100.00	
Registered voters/turnout	468,707	81.19	
Source: ECI

=== 1972 ===
Party	Votes	%	Seats	+/–
Indian National Congress	135,678	30.02	17	+1
Manipur Peoples Party	91,148	20.17	15	New
Communist Party of India	45,765	10.13	5	+4
Socialist Party (India)	24,195	5.35	3	New
Indian National Congress (Organisation)	10,699	2.37	1	New
Communist Party of India (Marxist)	2,988	0.66	0	0
Bharatiya Jana Sangh	1,004	0.22	0	New
Independents	140,471	31.08	19	+10
Total	451,948	100.00	60	+30
Valid votes	451,948	97.89		
Invalid/blank votes	9,744	2.11		
Total votes	461,692	100.00		
Registered voters/turnout	608,403	75.89		
Source: ECI

=== 1974 ===
Party	Votes	%	Seats	+/–
Indian National Congress	164,717	27.62	13	–4
Manipur Peoples Party	134,493	22.55	20	+5
Manipur Hills Union	55,879	9.37	12	New
Socialist Party	35,349	5.93	2	–1
Communist Party of India	33,039	5.54	6	+1
Kuki National Assembly	17,592	2.95	2	New
Indian National Congress (Organisation)	8,764	1.47	0	–1
Communist Party of India (Marxist)	3,347	0.56	0	0
Independents	143,241	24.02	5	–14
Total	596,421	100.00	60	0
Valid votes	596,421	97.91		
Invalid/blank votes	12,701	2.09		
Total votes	609,122	100.00		
Registered voters/turnout	719,971	84.60		
Source: ECI

=== 1980 ===
Party	Votes	%	Seats	+/–
Indian National Congress (I)	158,127	21.63	13	New
Janata Party	144,112	19.71	10	New
Indian National Congress (U)	69,319	9.48	6	New
Communist Party of India	53,055	7.26	5	–1
Manipur Peoples Party	48,196	6.59	4	–16
Janata Party (Secular)	20,667	2.83	0	New
Kuki National Assembly	20,600	2.82	2	0
Communist Party of India (Marxist)	4,168	0.57	1	+1
Janata Party (JP)	924	0.13	0	New
Independents	211,855	28.98	19	+14
Total	731,023	100.00	60	0
Valid votes	731,023	97.55		
Invalid/blank votes	18,381	2.45		
Total votes	749,404	100.00		
Registered voters/turnout	909,268	82.42		
Source: ECI

=== 1984 ===
Party	Votes	%	Seats	+/–
Indian National Congress	257,809	29.82	30	+30
Manipur Peoples Party	93,421	10.81	3	–1
Janata Party	52,530	6.08	4	–6
Communist Party of India	35,852	4.15	1	–4
Indian Congress (Socialist)	28,156	3.26	0	New
Kuki National Assembly	13,367	1.55	1	–1
Bharatiya Janata Party	6,163	0.71	0	New
Lok Dal	3,653	0.42	0	New
Communist Party of India (Marxist)	790	0.09	0	–1
Independents	372,766	43.12	21	+2
Total	864,507	100.00	60	0
Valid votes	864,507	97.70		
Invalid/blank votes	20,362	2.30		
Total votes	884,869	100.00		
Registered voters/turnout	1,013,680	87.29		
Source: ECI

=== 1990 ===
Party	Votes	%	Seats	+/–
Indian National Congress	333,765	33.71	24	–6
Janata Dal	196,207	19.82	11	New
Manipur Peoples Party	192,075	19.40	9	+6
Indian Congress (Socialist) – Sarat Chandra Sinha	122,829	12.41	4	New
Communist Party of India	41,012	4.14	3	+2
Kuki National Assembly	25,867	2.61	2	+1
Bharatiya Janata Party	18,549	1.87	0	0
Manipur Hill People's Council	8,820	0.89	0	New
National People's Party	7,762	0.78	1	New
Independents	43,101	4.35	0	–21
Total	989,987	100.00	54	–6
Valid votes	989,987	98.90		
Invalid/blank votes	10,997	1.10		
Total votes	1,000,984	100.00		
Registered voters/turnout	1,112,853	89.95		
Source: ECI

=== 1995 ===
Party	Votes	%	Seats	+/–
Indian National Congress	328,362	28.08	22	–2
Manipur Peoples Party	271,247	23.20	18	+9
Janata Dal	136,594	11.68	7	–4
Samata Party	70,887	6.06	2	New
Communist Party of India	64,026	5.48	2	–1
Federal Party of Manipur	56,300	4.82	2	New
Indian Congress (Socialist)	44,797	3.83	1	New
Bharatiya Janata Party	38,405	3.28	1	+1
National People's Party	30,417	2.60	2	+1
Samajwadi Janata Party (Rashtriya)	30,417	2.60	0	New
Kuki National Assembly	2,832	0.24	0	–2
Manipur Hill People's Council	2,440	0.21	0	0
Communist Party of India (Marxist)	2,327	0.20	0	New
Janata Party	1,611	0.14	0	New
Independents	88,526	7.57	3	+3
Total	1,169,188	100.00	60	+6
Valid votes	1,169,188	98.83		
Invalid/blank votes	13,868	1.17		
Total votes	1,183,056	100.00		
Registered voters/turnout	1,160,690	101.93		
Source: ECI

=== 2000 ===
Party	Votes	%	Seats	+/–
Manipur State Congress Party	331,141	26.28	23	New
Indian National Congress	230,748	18.31	11	–11
Bharatiya Janata Party	142,174	11.28	6	+5
Federal Party of Manipur	118,916	9.44	6	+4
Manipur Peoples Party	99,487	7.90	4	–14
Nationalist Congress Party	99,128	7.87	5	New
Samata Party	84,215	6.68	1	–2
Communist Party of India	45,309	3.60	0	–2
Rashtriya Janata Dal	23,037	1.83	1	New
Janata Dal (United)	22,576	1.79	1	New
Janata Dal (Secular)	19,945	1.58	1	New
Communist Party of India (Marxist)	3,783	0.30	0	0
Revolutionary Socialist Party	1,050	0.08	0	New
Kuki National Assembly	690	0.05	0	0
National People's Party	17	0.00	0	–2
Independents	37,875	3.01	1	–2
Total	1,260,091	100.00	60	0
Valid votes	1,260,091	99.07		
Invalid/blank votes	11,849	0.93		
Total votes	1,271,940	100.00		
Registered voters/turnout	1,415,933	89.83		
Source: ECI

=== 2002 ===
Party	Votes	%	Seats	+/–
Indian National Congress	345,660	26.18	20	+9
Federal Party of Manipur	239,444	18.14	13	+7
Manipur State Congress Party	163,758	12.40	7	–16
Bharatiya Janata Party	126,044	9.55	4	–2
Nationalist Congress Party	124,583	9.44	3	–2
Samata Party	109,912	8.33	3	+2
Communist Party of India	58,102	4.40	5	+5
Democratic Revolutionary Peoples Party	51,916	3.93	2	+2
Manipur National Conference	53,146	4.03	1	New
Manipur Peoples Party	40,006	3.03	2	–2
Janata Dal (United)	2,070	0.16	0	–1
Naga National Party	630	0.05	0	New
Communist Party of India (Marxist)	340	0.03	0	0
Samajwadi Janata Party (Rashtriya)	166	0.01	0	New
Lok Shakti	45	0.00	0	New
Independents	4,343	0.33	0	–1
Total	1,320,165	100.00	60	0
Valid votes	1,320,165	99.23		
Invalid/blank votes	10,294	0.77		
Total votes	1,330,459	100.00		
Registered voters/turnout	1,472,919	90.33		
Source: ECI

=== 2007 ===
Party	Votes	%	Seats	+/–
Indian National Congress	507,518	34.30	30	+10
Manipur Peoples Party	228,670	15.45	5	+3
Nationalist Congress Party	127,005	8.58	5	+2
Rashtriya Janata Dal	98,694	6.67	3	New
Communist Party of India	85,643	5.79	4	–1
National People's Party	51,192	3.46	3	New
Manipur State Congress Party	27,505	1.86	0	–7
Lok Jan Shakti Party	22,233	1.50	0	–2
Samajwadi Party	13,373	0.90	0	New
Bharatiya Janata Party	12,536	0.85	0	–4
Janata Dal (Secular)	7,144	0.48	0	New
Janata Dal (United)	4,333	0.29	0	0
People's Democratic Alliance	1,508	0.10	0	New
Communist Party of India (Marxist)	1,232	0.08	0	0
Samata Party	861	0.06	0	–3
Revolutionary Socialist Party	808	0.05	0	New
Naga National Party	562	0.04	0	0
All India Forward Bloc	109	0.01	0	New
Independents	288,661	19.51	10	+10
Total	1,479,587	100.00	60	0
Valid votes	1,479,587	99.97		
Invalid/blank votes	373	0.03		
Total votes	1,479,960	100.00		
Registered voters/turnout	1,707,204	86.69		
Source: ECI

=== 2012 ===
← Summary of the 2012 Manipur Legislative Assembly election results →
Parties and coalitions	Popular vote			Seats	
Parties and coalitions	Votes	%	±pp	Won	+/−
Indian National Congress (INC)	592,566	42.4		42	▲12
All India Trinamool Congress (AITC)	237,517	17.0		7	▲7
Manipur State Congress Party (MSCP)	117,170	8.4		5	▲5
Naga People's Front (NPF)	104,793	7.2		4	▲4
Nationalist Congress Party (NCP)	100,986	7.2		1	▼4
Communist Party of India (CPI)	80,798	5.8		0	▼4
Manipur People's Party (MPP)	55,975	4.0		0	▼5
National People's Party (NPP)	17,301	1.2		0	▼3
Lok Janshakti Party (LJP)	7,727	0.6		1	▲1
Rashtriya Janata Dal (RJD)	—N/a			0	▼3
Independent	46,023	3.3		0	▼10
Total		100.00		60	±0

=== 2017 ===
← Summary of the 4–8 March 2017 Manipur Legislative Assembly election results
Parties and coalitions	Popular vote			Seats	
Parties and coalitions	Votes	%	±pp	Won	+/−
Indian National Congress (INC)	582,056	35.1	▼6.9	28	▼19
Bharatiya Janata Party (BJP)	601,539	36.3	▲34.2	21	▲21
Naga People's Front (NPF)	118,850	7.2	▼0.3	4	Steady
National People's Party (NPP)	83,744	5.1	▲3.9	4	▲4
Independents	83,834	5.1	▲1.8	1	▲1
Lok Janshakti Party (LJP)	42,263	2.5	▲1.9	1	Steady
All India Trinamool Congress (AITC)	23,384	1.4	▼15.6	1	▼4
None of the Above (NOTA)	9,062	0.6	▲0.6	—N/a	
Total	1,657,975	100.00		60	±0
Valid votes	1,657,975	99.96			
Invalid votes	691	0.04			
Votes cast / turnout	1,658,666	86.63			
Abstentions	255,881	13.37			
Registered voters	1,914,547				

=== 2022 ===
Alliance	Party	Popular vote			Seats		
Alliance	Party	Votes	%	±pp	Contested	Won	+/−
NDA	Bharatiya Janata Party	702,632	37.83	▲2.73	60	32	▲11
	National People's Party	321,224	17.29	▲12.19	39	7	▲3
MPSA	Indian National Congress	312,659	16.83	▼18.57	53	5	▼23
MPSA	Communist Party of India	1,032	0.06	▼0.68	2	0	Steady
MPSA	Total	322,691	16.89		54 (Note: INC and CPI have a friendly fight in one constituency.)	5	
None	Janata Dal (United)	200,100	10.77	New	38	6	New
None	Naga People's Front	150,209	8.09	▲0.89	9	5	▲1
None	Kuki People's Alliance	139,853	7.53		2	2	▲2
None	Independents		7.53			3	▲2
None	NOTA		0.56				
Total			100			60	
Valid votes							
Invalid votes							
Votes cast/ turnout							
Abstentions							
Registered voters							

== Lok Sabha elections ==
The elections held in Manipur for Lok Sabha are listed below.

Year	Lok Sabha term	Inner Manipur	Outer Manipur
1952	1st Lok Sabha	INC	Socialist Party (India)
1957	2nd Lok Sabha	Socialist Party (India)	INC
1962	3rd Lok Sabha	INC	Socialist Party (India)
1967	4th Lok Sabha	CPI	INC
1971	5th Lok Sabha	INC	INC
1977	6th Lok Sabha	INC	INC
1980	7th Lok Sabha	CPI	INC
1984	8th Lok Sabha	INC	INC
1989	9th Lok Sabha	INC	INC
1991	10th Lok Sabha	MPP	INC
1996	11th Lok Sabha	INC	INC
1998	12th Lok Sabha	MSCP	CPI
1999	13th Lok Sabha	MSCP	NCP
2004	14th Lok Sabha	INC	Independent
2009	15th Lok Sabha	INC	INC
2014	16th Lok Sabha	INC	INC
2019	17th Lok Sabha	BJP	NPF
2024	18th Lok Sabha	INC	INC

== See also ==
- List of constituencies of the Manipur Legislative Assembly
- Imphal Municipal Corporation
