= Haokip (clan) =

Haokip is one of the surname of Thadou/Kuki origin and a prominent Thadou clan. Notable people with the surname include:

- Yamthong Haokip, Indian politician and MLA from Saikul
- Paokai Haokip, Indian politician and former Member of Parliament in the 4th Lok Sabha, 1967-70
- Holkhomang Haokip, Indian politician and former Minister of Manipur and Member of Parliament during the 13th Lok Sabha
- Ngamthang Haokip, Indian politician and former Minister of Manipur
- T Thangzalam Haokip, Indian politician, Chairman, Hill Areas Committee of Manipur
- Letpao Haokip, Indian politician, and Minister for Irrigation and Flood Control (IFC) of Manipur
- T N Haokip (born 1964), Indian politician and president of the Manipur Pradesh Congress Committee
- Paolienlal Haokip, Indian politician and MLA from Saikot
- Letzamang Haokip, Indian politician and MLA from Henglep
- Boithang Haokip (born 1991), Indian footballer
- Thongkhosiem Haokip (born 1993), Indian footballer
- T S Haokip, Columnist, and author of the book Hilly Dreams
- Themneihat Haokip, Indian actress
