= Lorho =

Lorho is a surname.

== List of people with the given name ==
- Lorho S. Pfoze, Indian politician

== List of people with the surname ==
- Marie-France Lorho (born 1964), French politician
- Soso Lorho (1939 – 19 April 2018), Indian politician
