= Maoist Communist Party of Manipur =

- Abbreviation: MCPM
- Leader: Chiranglen Sapamcha
- Founded: September 2011; 15 years ago
- Preceded by: Manipur Forward Youth Front (MAFYF)
- Headquarters: Manipur
- Newspaper: • Red Thunder (monthly) • Red Manipur (quarterly)
- Armed organ: New People's Militia
- Ideology: Communism; Marxism–Leninism–Maoism; Gonzalo Thought; Separatism
- Acknowledgement: Communist Party of India (Maoist)
- Colors: Red

Party flag

The Maoist Communist Party of Manipur is a Maoist political party in Manipur which aims "to establish a communist society through armed revolutionary war." The Maoist Communist Party of Manipur also intends at liberating the people of Manipur from whom they view as "colonial India."

== Background and ideology ==
The Maoist Communist Party of Manipur (MCPM) was formed in August 2011 after amended its constitution in accordance with Marxism–Leninism–Maoism and decided to take up M–L–M as the party's guiding ideology. After the party's first conference which was held in the North-East, the party issued a statement declaring that the MCPM has decided to carry out the New Democratic Revolution and would conduct the protracted people's war in collaboration with the other "Maoist revolutionary parties."

== Organisation ==
The Coordinator of the Standing Committee of MCPM is Kyonghan, and its vice chairperson is Mang Ulen San. The Publicity and Propaganda secretary is Nonglen Meitei. The MCPM has alleged that Chingranglen Meitei, who was working as the General Secretary of the party was ferret out and arrested by a squad of the Indian armed forces, while he was approaching towards his comrades. On 20 May 2014, the MCPM released an official statement that the party was not being able to trace Chingranglen Meitei since the time of his alleged abduction [by Indian personnel], and has no clue about his "whereabouts."

A united revolution is still a failure in Manipur due to cerebrated design of those trying to create division amongst indigenous community inhabiting in the state from time immemorial.| Nonglen Meitei, in 2012.

=== Central Military Commission ===
The MCPM structured the party's Central Military Commission (CMC) on 21 September 2012, and Taibanglen Meitei is also the CMC's chairperson.

=== New People's Militia ===
On 21 September 2012, the MCPM also constituted an armed wing in the guidance of its CMC, known as "New People's Militia," whose objective is to muster a "People's Guerilla Army." The party's chairperson has voiced that the New People's Militia (NPM) was established in the light of Mao's Theory of Three Magic Weapons, and it aims at "carrying out offensive against colonial forces to regain Manipur people's freedom status." The party believes that, despite being at the "initial stage," it is still "capable of launching offensives in mobile," and is looking forward to raise the NPM's strength, eyeing to "effectively launch positional war with the enemy [Indian State]."

== Legal status ==
The MCPM is a banned organisation.

== Relations with other insurgents ==
The Communist Party of India (Maoist) has termed the establishment of MCPM as "an event of historical significance in the annals of the history of revolution in South-Asia" and has stated that "it would fight shoulder to shoulder with them [MCPM] in the fight against the common enemy – the Indian State." The CPI (Maoist) had also maintained close ties with the KCP (Maoist) and the People's Liberation Army of Manipur in the past. The KCP (Maoist), in November 2010, pledged "support" to "Indian Maoists."

World Proletarian Revolution would have a new lease of life if Maoist groups operating in Asia worked together on a common platform by setting up an Asian Maoist Coordinating Committee.

— Taibanglen Meitei, on the occasion of second anniversary of the MCPM

== Election boycott ==
The MCPM boycotted the 2012 Manipur Legislative Assembly election and banned "all election related functions" in the state because the party believed that the "assembly elections in Manipur would never bring welfare to the people nor bring any development" and would just amplify the "Indian system of rule."

In April 2014, the MCPM called for a "political strike" in Manipur and boycotted the Indian general election, 2014 in the state, saying that "the Indian election is not needed." The ban imposed on the Indian general election, 2014 in Manipur by the MCPM along with the United Revolutionary Front, and the Kuki National Army (Indian) affected the political campaigning of the candidates, and they had to drop their door–to–door campaign while several candidates avoided to visit their constituencies as a violent armed action was expected beyond doubt if "electioneering" would have been attempted in Manipur. The MCPM had urged its comrades to closely and alertly monitor the electoral campaign of the political parties and their contestants, and to execute strategies to pester the election process while avoiding to engender inconvenience to the people.

Conducting India's elections in Manipur was nothing but a deliberate attempt to divert the mind of the people of the state from the armed struggle for liberation and to portray it (liberation struggle) in the wrong sense.

— Maoist Communist Party of Manipur, in 2014

== See also ==
- Abhizeet Asom
- Paresh Baruah
- Insurgency in Northeast India
- Operation Green Hunt
- Operation Steeplechase
- List of Naxalite and Maoist groups in India
