= Tentha =

- Village
- Location in Manipur, India Tentha (India)
- Coordinates: 24.58°N 93.98°E
- Country: India
- State: Manipur
- District: Thoubal

Population (2001)
  - Total: 6,704

Languages
  - Official: Meiteilon (Manipuri)
- Time zone: UTC+5:30 (IST)
- PIN: 795148
- Telephone code: 03848
- Vehicle registration: MN
- Website: manipur.gov.in

Tentha is a village in Thoubal District in Manipur, India.

== About Tentha ==
It is one of the large village in Thobal district. It is surrounded by Wabgai in south-west, Ikop lake in north, Wangjing in east, and Khangabok in north-east.

== Demographics ==
As of 2001 India census, Tentha had a population of 6704. Males and females population are 3340 and 3364, respectively.

== Localities in Tentha ==
Name of localities (leikai) in Tentha are:

- Tentha Thambal Chingya
- Tentha Khunjao Makha Leikai
- Tentha Mayai Leikai
- Tentha Mathak Leikai
- Tentha Tuwabal
- Tentha Khongbal
- Tentha Heibung
- Tentha Khunou
- Tentha Marongband

== Economy ==
Majority of the people in this village practice agriculture. Tentha is famous for the production of fish in Thoubal district.

== Connectivity ==
There are 4 important inter-village roads which connect Tentha with other parts of the district, they are:

- Wangjing-Tentha road
- Tentha-Marongband road
- Khangabok/Wabagai-Tentha road and
- Kakching-Tentha road

== Politics ==
Wangjing Tentha assembly constituency (Assembly Constituency No. 34) is part of Outer Manipur (Lok Sabha constituency).

== See also ==
- Moirangthem Nara
