= Nabakishore =

Nabakishore is a surname. Notable people with the surname include:

- Oinam Nabakishore, Indian Administrative Service (IAS) officer, politician
- Laishram Nabakishore Singh (1938–2024), Indian teacher, herbalist and physician
