= N. Gouzagin =

Indian politician

Member of Parliament, Lok Sabha
- In office 1980-1984
- Preceded by: Rishang Keishing
- Succeeded by: Yangmaso Shaiza
- Constituency: Outer Manipur

Personal details
- Born: 1933 Bungpilon, Thanlon, Manipur, British India (now in Manipur, India)
- Died: 2004 (aged 70–71)
- Party: Indian National Congress

N. Gouzagin (1933 – 2004) was an Indian politician. He was a Member of Parliament, representing Outer Manipur in the Lok Sabha, the lower house of India's Parliament.
