= Themneihat Haokip =

Indian Thadou-Kuki actress (1978–2020)

Pi, Themneihat Haokip
- Born: 11 May 1978; Sangaikot
- Died: 2 June 2020 (aged 42); Churachandpur
- Other name: Themneihat Simte
- Spouse: S. Langginmang Simte

Themneihat Haokip was an Indian Thadou-Kuki actress known for portraying Hoinu in the hit film Kum 10 Kilungset (1994). Her second film Hinkho (1995) was also a box office success. She was one of the well known actresses of Kuki films during the 1990s.

== Death ==
She died on 2 June 2020 due to a stroke.

== Filmography ==
Year	Film	Role	Ref.
1994	Kum 10 Kilungset	Hoinu	
1995	Hinkho		
