= Soso Lorho =

Soso Lorho (1 March 1939 – 19 April 2018) hailing from Tunggam Afii Village in Senapati district was an Indian politician. Lorho served as Minister in the Manipur state government at different times, including as Acting Chief Minister.

In 1978 he stood as the Congress (I) candidate in an Outer Manipur Lok Sabha seat by-election. He finished in second place with 49,039 votes. He was elected to the Manipur Legislative Assembly in 1980 as a Congress (I) candidate. Following the election he became Minister for Health, Power, Cooperation, PHED and Statistics. He was again elected to the assembly in 1985. In the cabinet formed after the election he became Minister of Agriculture, PWD and Tribal Development. He was re-elected again in 1990.

In 2014 he served as the president of the Manipur state unit of the Naga People's Front. He was fielded by the NPF as its candidate in the Outer Manipur seat in the 2014 Indian general election.

He died on 19 April 2018 at a hospital in Imphal. He was 80 years old.
