= Paokai Haokip =

Indian politician (1941–2021)

Member of Parliament, Lok Sabha
- In office 1967-1977
- Preceded by: Rishang Keishing
- Succeeded by: Yangmaso Shaiza
- Constituency: Outer Manipur

Personal details
- Born: February 1941 Saitu, Manipur, British India (now in Manipur, India)
- Died: June 6, 2021 (aged 80)
- Party: Indian National Congress

Paokai Haokip (February 1941 – June 6, 2021) was an Indian politician from Manipur. He was a Member of Parliament, representing Outer Manipur in the Lok Sabha, the lower house of India's Parliament.
