= Kim Gangte =

Member of Parliament, Lok Sabha
- In office 10 March 1998 – 26 April 1999
- Constituency: Outer Manipur

Personal details
- Born: 30 November 1968 (age 57); Manipur, India
- Party: Bharatiya Janata Party (2017–present)
- Other political affiliations: Manipur People's Party (1998–1999); Janata Dal (United) (1999); All India Trinamool Congress
- Profession: Agriculturist, politician, journalist, educator, social worker

Kim Gangte (born 30 October 1963) is an Indian politician, educator and human rights activist, who was a Member of Parliament elected from the Outer Manipur Lok Sabha constituency in India in 1998, as a Manipur People's Party candidate. She is the general secretary of the Kuki Women Human Rights Network.

Kim Gangte is a social worker, human rights activist and politician, the first woman from Manipur to become a Member of the Indian Parliament She is also the first Seventh-day Adventist to serve in the Lok Sabha.

== Early life and education ==
Kim was born on 30 October 1963 in Uyungmakhong, Churachandpur district, in Manipur to Vumkhosei Gangte. Her father Vumkhosei Gangte had received his early education in Shillong, but couldn't continue his studies, and hence remained a farmer. Kim's mother Kimsi Sitlhou is a homemaker. Her parents encountered extreme hardships throughout their lives and managed to provide the best possible education to their seven children. Kim is the eldest of her siblings.

Kim finished her schooling at the Seventh-day Adventist School at Shillong. She completed her standard 12th as a private student in Manipur, as she started teaching in a school right after completion of her 10th. She completed her graduation in English, History and Education from Guwahati University. She completed her M. Phil in English Literature from Pune University. She also pursued a course in English language teaching from the Institute of English and Foreign Languages, Osmania University, Hyderabad. She worked as a lecturer, teaching English in the State Council Of Education and Research Training Centre in Imphal.

== Career ==
While attending her M. Phil classes, she started working as a lecturer in English at the Spicer Memorial College, Pune. She also worked as a lecturer teaching English in the State Council of Education and Research Training (SCERT) Centre in Imphal.

At the same time, she also joined the All India Radio Imphal, English Programme (Western Music) as a part-time announcer while also working as a correspondent with the Eastern Panorama magazine.

She was elected to the 12th Lok Sabha in 1998. However, as then Atal Bihari Vajpayee-led government was voted out in a no-confidence motion in 1999. She contested the 1999 Lok Sabha elections as a Janata Dal (United) candidate, but was defeated by Holkhomang Haokip of the Nationalist Congress Party. After that she remained away from politics for sometime. At the same time, she was also a member of the Consultative Committee under the Ministry of Social Justice and Empowerment.

After resigning from her job as lecturer at SCERT at the end of 1995, Kim has been involved with the activities of the Kuki Women Human Rights body as well the Kuki Students' Organisation.

In January 2017, she joined BJP ahead of Manipur Legislative Assembly election in 2017. She quit the party in March 2019 to join NPP.

In an interview with NewsClick on 5 July 2023, she blamed the BJP for the 2023 Manipur violence, and alleged that militant groups, Arambai Tenggol and Meitei Leepun, were creations of the RSS.

== Interests ==
Kim enjoys meditation, gardening, and cooking. In her free time she likes to promote awareness about political, social, educational and human rights among the people, especially women, the poor and the downtrodden.

== Interviews & Dialogues ==
- Kim Gangte — Manipur's first woman MP
- Kim Gangte wants Equal Development
- Kim Gangte takes jibes at BJP, Congress
