= Thangso Baite =

Indian politician

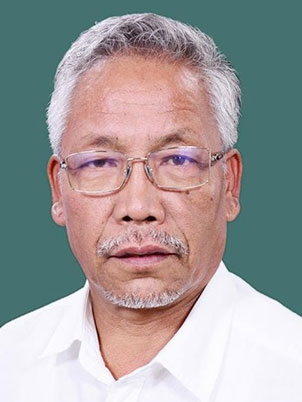

Member of Parliament, Lok Sabha
- In office 2009 - 2019
- Preceded by: Mani Charenamei
- Succeeded by: Lorho S. Pfoze
- Constituency: Outer Manipur

Personal details
- Born: 17 April 1953 (age 73)
- Party: INC
- Spouse: Hatkhoneng Baite
- Children: 2 Sons and 3 Daughters
- Education: M.A. (Political Science) J.N.U. Center, Imphal, Manipur

Thangso Baite is an Indian politician. He was a member of the 15th and 16th Lok Sabha from 2009 to 2019 representing the Outer Manipur constituency in the state of Manipur, situated in the North-Eastern India. He was a candidate for the Indian National Congress (INC) political party. He is the second son of (L) Shri Ngamkhotong Baite and (L) Smt. Otvah Baite and hails from Dongjang Village, Churachandpur District, Manipur.

Prior to this, he was also a member of the 8th Manipur Legislative Assembly from 2002 to 2007 representing the 60-Singhat (ST) Assembly Constituency and served as Minister of State, Government of Manipur from 2002 to 2005.
