= Oinam Nabakishore =

Oinam Nabakishore Singh (ꯑꯣꯏꯅꯥꯝ ꯅꯕꯀꯤꯁꯣꯔ) is an Indian politician, and Indian Administrative Service (IAS) officer of the 1984 batch from the Manipur–Tripura cadre. He served as the Chief Secretary to the Government of Manipur, succeeding P. C. Lawmkunga upon the latter’s retirement on 30 September 2015.

== Early life and education ==
Oinam Nabakishore Singh is a native of Ningthoukhong in Bishnupur district, Manipur. He topped the state matriculation examination in 1975. He studied Physics at St. Stephen’s College, Delhi, where he completed both his undergraduate and postgraduate degrees. He was among the top students in the MSc (Physics) programme of the University of Delhi in 1982.

== Career ==
Indian Administrative Service

Singh joined the Indian Administrative Service in the 1984 batch, belonging to the Manipur–Tripura cadre. Before becoming Chief Secretary, he served as Additional Chief Secretary and Chief Executive Officer (Election) in the Government of Manipur.

Chief Secretary of Manipur

He was appointed Chief Secretary of Manipur following the retirement of P. C. Lawmkunga, a 1979 batch IAS officer. The appointment came after consideration of several other senior IAS officers from the Manipur–Tripura cadre.

=== Political career ===
After taking voluntary retirement from the Indian Administrative Service, Oinam Nabakishore Singh entered politics and joined the Indian National Congress (INC). In March 2019, he was considered as the party’s leading choice for the Inner Manipur Parliamentary Constituency during the general elections.

During an interaction with residents of Hiyangthang Tarahei under Naoriya Pakhanglakpa Assembly Constituency, Singh stated that he joined politics to better serve the people of Manipur. He expressed opposition to the Citizenship (Amendment) Bill, 2016, calling it contrary to the secular structure of the Constitution, and affirmed the Congress Party’s stance against it.

Singh also highlighted various developmental challenges faced by the state and participated in party activities aimed at addressing issues affecting indigenous communities in Manipur.

== Recognition ==
On 10 October 2015, the St. Stephen’s College Alumni, Manipur Chapter felicitated Singh at a ceremony held at Imphal Hotel. His felicitation ceremony event was attended by Cabinet Minister Irengbam Hemochandra Singh, Additional Chief Secretary W. L. Hangshing, and several other alumni and senior officials from Manipur.

== See also ==
- Oinam family
