= Letzamang Haokip =

Indian politician

Member of the Manipur Legislative Assembly

Personal details
- Born: 1975 (age 50–51)
- Occupation: Social worker

Letzamang Haokip is an Indian politician from Manipur and member of the Bharatiya Janata Party. Haokip was first elected as a member of the Manipur Legislative Assembly from Henglep constituency in Churachandpur District on a BJP ticket in 2022.

== History ==
- Elected MLA from 57 Henglep(ST) A/C, 12th Manipur Legislative Assembly 2022.
