= Thokchom Meinya =

Indian politician

Dr. Thokchom Meinya

Member of Parliament Lok Sabha
- In office 2004–2019
- Preceded by: Thounaojam Chaoba Singh
- Succeeded by: Rajkumar Ranjan Singh
- Constituency: Inner Manipur

Personal details
- Born: 12 October 1945 (age 80) Imphal West, Manipur
- Party: INC
- Spouse: Thokchom Sorojini Devi
- Children: 1 son and 1 daughter
- As of 16 September, 2006

Dr. Thokchom Meinya (born 12 October 1945) is a former member of Parliament who served three consecutive terms of the Lok Sabha. He represented the Inner Manipur constituency of Manipur and won the 2004, 2009 and 2014 elections, as a candidate of the Indian National Congress (INC) political party.
