= Heirok Assembly constituency =

Legislative Assembly constituency in Manipur State, India

Coordinates: 24.58°N 94.08°E

Heirok
- Constituency for the Manipur Legislative Assembly

Constituency details
- Country: India
- Region: Northeast India
- State: Manipur
- District: Thoubal
- Lok Sabha constituency: Outer Manipur
- Established: 1972
- Total electors: 33,098
- Reservation: None

Member of Legislative Assembly
- 12th Manipur Legislative Assembly
- Incumbent Thokchom Radheshyam Singh
- Party: Bharatiya Janata Party

Heirok Legislative Assembly constituency is one of the 60 Legislative Assembly constituencies of Manipur state in India.

It is part of Thoubal district.

== Extent ==
Heirok is the 33rd among 60 assembly constituencies of Manipur. It has 39 parts namely: 1-Chandrakhong (A), 2-Ningel, 3-Leirongthel (A), 4-Pitra, 5-Nongpok Sekmai, 6-Shikhong Khunbi, 7-Ingourok, 8-Shikhong Khunou, 9-Hijam Khunou, 10-Ukhongshang Maning, 11-Ukhongshang Mamang, 2-Lourembam Makha, 13-Lourembam Awang, 14-Langmeithet, 15-Kang Yambem Makha Leikai, 16-Kang Yambem Mamang Leikai, 17 - Kang Thokchao Awang Leikai, 18 - Pechi, 19 - Bengi, 20 - Thokchom, 21 - Heirok Part I Heituppokpi, 22 - Heirok Part I Heituppokpi Mamang, 23 - Heirok Part III Ngarouthel, 24 - Heirok Part III Lam Mari Phangba Maning, 25 - Heirok Part III Lam Mari Phangba Mamang, 26 - Heirok Part-III Kabo Leikai, 27 - Heirok Part-I Mamang Leikai, 28 - Heirok Part-II Doctorshang Mamang, 29 - Heirok Part-II Doctorshang Maning, 30 - Heirok Part-II Maning Leikai, 31 - Heirok Part-II Laimayum Mamang, 32 - Heirok Part II Bazar Maning, 33 - Heirok Part II Bazar, 34 - Heirok Part II Mayai Leikai, 35 - Heirok Part-II Devi Mandop Leikai, 36 - Heirok part-II Chingdompok, 37 - Kang Yambem Awang Leikai, 38 - Kang Thokchao Makha Leikai, 39 - Heirok Part-II Bazar Mamang.

== Members of the Legislative Assembly ==
Year	Winner	Party
1972	Mibotombi Singh	Indian National Congress
1974	Moirangthem Tombi	Indian National Congress
1980	Moirangthem Tombi	Janata Party
1984	Moirangthem Tombi	Indian National Congress
1990	Nongmeikapam Komol Singh	Janata Dal
1995	Moirangthem Okendro	Indian National Congress
2000	Moirangthem Okendro	Indian National Congress
2002	Nongmeikapam Sovakiran Singh	Federal Party of Manipur
2007	Moirangthem Okendro	Indian National Congress
2012	Moirangthem Okendro	Indian National Congress
2017	Thokchom Radheshyam Singh	Bharatiya Janata Party
2022	Thokchom Radheshyam Singh	Bharatiya Janata Party

== Election results ==
Vote share of winning candidates
2022	42.80%
2017	46.63%
2012	53.19%
2007	57.71%
2002	46.46%
2000	40.29%
1995	36.40%
1990	44.45%
1984	44.12%
1980	39.20%
1974	57.49%
1972	37.76%

=== 2027 Assembly election ===
2027 Manipur Legislative Assembly election: Heirok
Party	Candidate	Votes	%	±%
INC				
NDA				
NOTA	None of the above			
Majority				
Turnout				
gain from		Swing		

=== 2022 Assembly election ===
2022 Manipur Legislative Assembly election: Heirok
Party	Candidate	Votes	%	±%
BJP	Thokchom Radheshyam Singh	13,589	42.80%	−3.82%
INC	Moirangthem Okendro	13,186	41.53%	0.64%
NPP	Ningthoujam Diten Singh	4,766	15.01%	
Margin of victory		403	1.27%	−4.47%
Turnout		31,748	95.92%	1.14%
Registered electors		33,098		9.25%
BJP hold		Swing	-3.82%	

=== 2017 Assembly election ===
2017 Manipur Legislative Assembly election: Heirok
Party	Candidate	Votes	%	±%
BJP	Thokchom Radheshyam Singh	13,389	46.63%	
INC	Moirangthem Okendro	11,742	40.89%	−12.30%
NCP	Ningthoujam Diten Singh	3,321	11.57%	
Margin of victory		1,647	5.74%	−16.94%
Turnout		28,715	94.78%	−1.24%
Registered electors		30,297		14.32%
BJP gain from INC		Swing	-6.56%	

=== 2012 Assembly election ===
2012 Manipur Legislative Assembly election: Heirok
Party	Candidate	Votes	%	±%
INC	Moirangthem Okendro	13,535	53.19%	−4.52%
MPP	Nongmeikapam Sovakiran Singh	7,764	30.51%	−11.16%
MSCP	Sumatibala Ningthoujam	4,136	16.25%	
Margin of victory		5,771	22.68%	6.64%
Turnout		25,447	95.97%	4.38%
Registered electors		26,503		1.75%
INC hold		Swing	-4.52%	

=== 2007 Assembly election ===
2007 Manipur Legislative Assembly election: Heirok
Party	Candidate	Votes	%	±%
INC	M. Okendro	13,775	57.71%	14.25%
MPP	N. Sovakiran Singh	9,947	41.68%	
Margin of victory		3,828	16.04%	13.05%
Turnout		23,868	91.63%	−0.45%
Registered electors		26,048		17.90%
INC gain from FPM		Swing	11.26%	

=== 2002 Assembly election ===
2002 Manipur Legislative Assembly election: Heirok
Party	Candidate	Votes	%	±%
FPM	Nongmeikapam Sovakiran Singh	9,376	46.46%	
INC	Moirangthem Okendro	8,772	43.46%	3.18%
MSCP	Ningthoujam Borchandra Singh	1,254	6.21%	−16.59%
Manipur National Conference	S. Kondum	307	1.52%	
CPI	Ningthoujam Muhindro Singh	284	1.41%	
SAP	Moirangthem Tombi	189	0.94%	0.32%
Margin of victory		604	2.99%	−5.99%
Turnout		20,182	92.08%	−1.93%
Registered electors		22,094		5.04%
FPM gain from INC		Swing	10.05%	

=== 2000 Assembly election ===
2000 Manipur Legislative Assembly election: Heirok
Party	Candidate	Votes	%	±%
INC	Moirangthem Okendro	7,665	40.29%	3.89%
BJP	Nongmeikapam Komol Singh	5,956	31.31%	
MSCP	N. Borchandra Singh	4,338	22.80%	
FPM	Maibam Jugeshwar Singh	948	4.98%	
SAP	Moirangthem Tombi	118	0.62%	
Margin of victory		1,709	8.98%	2.23%
Turnout		19,025	91.26%	−2.75%
Registered electors		21,034		10.28%
INC hold		Swing	3.89%	

=== 1995 Assembly election ===
1995 Manipur Legislative Assembly election: Heirok
Party	Candidate	Votes	%	±%
INC	Moirangthem Okendro	6,456	36.40%	−4.58%
MPP	Nongmeikapam Komol Singh	5,258	29.65%	20.35%
CPI	Khundongbam Khelendra Singh	2,773	15.64%	
IC(S)	Maibam Jugeshwor Singh	2,397	13.52%	
Independent	Ningthoujam Borchandra Singh	505	2.85%	
Independent	Laishram Krishnadas	346	1.95%	
Margin of victory		1,198	6.76%	3.28%
Turnout		17,735	94.01%	3.11%
Registered electors		19,073		−7.40%
INC gain from JD		Swing	-8.05%	

=== 1990 Assembly election ===
1990 Manipur Legislative Assembly election: Heirok
Party	Candidate	Votes	%	±%
JD	Nongmeikapam Komol Singh	8,207	44.45%	
INC	Moirangthem Tombi	7,566	40.98%	−3.14%
MPP	Laishram Krishna Das Singh	1,716	9.29%	−8.57%
INS(SCS)	Th. Biramangol Singh	973	5.27%	
Margin of victory		641	3.47%	−2.64%
Turnout		18,462	90.90%	0.29%
Registered electors		20,598		26.72%
JD gain from INC		Swing	0.33%	

=== 1984 Assembly election ===
1984 Manipur Legislative Assembly election: Heirok
Party	Candidate	Votes	%	±%
INC	Moirangthem Tombi	6,274	44.12%	
Independent	Nongmeikapam Nilakamal	5,405	38.01%	
MPP	Laishram Krishna	2,540	17.86%	
Margin of victory		869	6.11%	4.67%
Turnout		14,219	90.61%	3.00%
Registered electors		16,255		10.35%
INC gain from JP		Swing	4.93%	

=== 1980 Assembly election ===
1980 Manipur Legislative Assembly election: Heirok
Party	Candidate	Votes	%	±%
JP	Moirangthem Tombi	4,936	39.20%	
INC(I)	Nongmeikapam Nilakamal	4,754	37.75%	
CPI	Khudongbam Kheiendro	2,903	23.05%	
Margin of victory		182	1.45%	−13.54%
Turnout		12,593	87.62%	−0.99%
Registered electors		14,730		18.36%
JP gain from INC		Swing	-18.29%	

=== 1974 Assembly election ===
1974 Manipur Legislative Assembly election: Heirok
Party	Candidate	Votes	%	±%
INC	Moirangthem Tombi	6,171	57.49%	19.73%
MPP	Soibam Kushmu Singh	4,563	42.51%	20.54%
Margin of victory		1,608	14.98%	2.56%
Turnout		10,734	88.61%	1.41%
Registered electors		12,445		17.31%
INC hold		Swing	19.73%	

=== 1972 Assembly election ===
1972 Manipur Legislative Assembly election: Heirok
Party	Candidate	Votes	%	±%
INC	Mibotombi Singh	3,401	37.76%	
CPI	Moirangthem Yaima	2,282	25.33%	
MPP	Chakpram Rameshwar Singh	1,979	21.97%	
Independent	Laishramibomcha Singh	1,040	11.55%	
Independent	Mairam Nimai	136	1.51%	
CPI(M)	Khundrapamitocha Singh	98	1.09%	
Independent	Laisram Krishnadas	72	0.80%	
Margin of victory		1,119	12.42%	
Turnout		9,008	87.20%	
Registered electors		10,609		
INC win (new seat)				

== See also ==
- List of constituencies of the Manipur Legislative Assembly
- Thoubal district
