= Henglep Assembly constituency =

Legislative Assembly constituency in Manipur State, India

Coordinates: 24.51°N 93.51°E

Henglep
- Constituency No. 57 for the Manipur Legislative Assembly

Constituency details
- Country: India
- Region: Northeast India
- State: Manipur
- District: Churachandpur
- Lok Sabha constituency: Outer Manipur
- Established: 1972
- Total electors: 31,944
- Reservation: ST

Member of Legislative Assembly
- 12th Manipur Legislative Assembly
- Incumbent Letzamang Haokip
- Party: BJP
- Elected year: 2022

Henglep is one of the 60 Legislative Assembly constituencies of Manipur state in India.

It is part of Churachandpur district and is reserved for candidates belonging to the Scheduled Tribes.

== Members of the Legislative Assembly ==
Year	Winner	Party
1972	Holkhomang	Independent politician
1974	Holkhomang	Indian National Congress
1980	Holkhomang	Independent politician
1984	Sehpu Haokip	Independent politician
1990	Holkhomang	Indian Congress (Socialist) – Sarat Chandra Sinha
1995	Sehpu Haokip	Janata Dal
1998 by-election	T. Thangzalam Haokip	Manipur State Congress Party
2000	T. Manga Vaiphei	Indian National Congress
2002	T. Manga Vaiphei	Samata Party
2007	T. Manga Vaiphei	Indian National Congress
2012	T. Manga Vaiphei	Indian National Congress
2017	T. Thangzalam Haokip	Bharatiya Janata Party
2022	Letzamang Haokip	Bharatiya Janata Party

== Election results ==
Vote share of winning candidates
2022	50.36%
2017	35.48%
2012	27.53%
2007	25.91%
2002	36.97%
2000	27.09%
1998 by-election	43.59%
1995	34.11%
1990	29.12%
1984	43.96%
1980	24.59%
1974	55.64%
1972	48.10%

=== 2027 Assembly election ===
2027 Manipur Legislative Assembly election: Henglep
Party	Candidate	Votes	%	±%
INC				
NDA				
NOTA	None of the above			
Majority				
Turnout				
gain from		Swing		

=== 2022 Assembly election ===
2022 Manipur Legislative Assembly election: Henglep
Party	Candidate	Votes	%	±%
BJP	Letzamang Haokip	13,897	50.36%	▲14.88
INC	T. Manga Vaiphei	6,049	21.92%	▼12.43
NPP	Nehminthang Haokip	3,824	13.86%	▼7.78
SS	T. Thangzalam Haokip	2,605	9.44%	New
JD(U)	Genneikhup	1,097	3.98%	New
NOTA	None of the Above	40	0.14%	▼0.15
Margin of victory		7,848	28.44%	▲27.31
Turnout		27,596	86.39%	▲5.63
Registered electors		31,944		▲8.47
BJP hold		Swing	▲14.88	

=== 2017 Assembly election ===
2017 Manipur Legislative Assembly election: Henglep
Party	Candidate	Votes	%	±%
BJP	T. Thangzalam Haokip	8,438	35.48%	New
INC	T. Manga Vaiphei	8,170	34.35%	▲6.82
NPP	Letzamang Haokip	5,146	21.64%	New
Manipur National Democratic Front	Mangcha Gangte	1,303	5.48%	New
NPF	Thongzamlien	547	2.30%	▼16.80
NOTA	None of the Above	71	0.30%	New
Margin of victory		268	1.13%	▼0.97
Turnout		23,782	80.76%	▲16.96
Registered electors		29,449		▲7.92
BJP gain from INC		Swing	▲7.95	

=== 2012 Assembly election ===
2012 Manipur Legislative Assembly election: Henglep
Party	Candidate	Votes	%	±%
INC	T. Manga Vaiphei	4,793	27.53%	▲1.62
AITC	T. Thangzalam Haokip	4,428	25.43%	New
NPF	Sehpu Haokip	3,326	19.10%	New
MSCP	Dr. Jainson Haokip	2,867	16.47%	New
CPI	Gelunthang	1,815	10.43%	▲6.27
NCP	Thangliansang	181	1.04%	▼12.01
Margin of victory		365	2.10%	▼4.57
Turnout		17,410	63.80%	▼16.97
Registered electors		27,288		▲1.04
INC hold		Swing	▲1.62	

=== 2007 Assembly election ===
2007 Manipur Legislative Assembly election: Henglep
Party	Candidate	Votes	%	±%
INC	T. Manga Vaiphei	5,653	25.91%	▲8.24
LJP	T. Thangzalam Haokip	4,198	19.24%	New
RJD	Tinkhonei Haokip	3,822	17.52%	New
JD(U)	Sehpu Haokip	3,768	17.27%	New
NCP	Thangliansang	2,847	13.05%	▼0.45
CPI	Kim Gangte	906	4.15%	New
Independent	Serto Sumneikhup Kom	372	1.71%	New
SP	Ngulkhothang	127	0.58%	New
BJP	Letkhosei Haokip	121	0.55%	▼11.65
Margin of victory		1,455	6.67%	▼12.63
Turnout		21,814	80.77%	▼11.59
Registered electors		27,008		▲20.40
INC gain from SAP		Swing	▼11.06	

=== 2002 Assembly election ===
2002 Manipur Legislative Assembly election: Henglep
Party	Candidate	Votes	%	±%
SAP	T. Manga Vaiphei	7,660	36.97%	▲20.54
INC	T. Thangzalam Haokip	3,662	17.68%	▼9.42
FPM	Jainson Haokip	3,320	16.03%	▲14.74
NCP	Thongsei Haokip	2,797	13.50%	▲0.43
BJP	Sehpu Haokip	2,529	12.21%	New
MSCP	Lamminlien Gangte	402	1.94%	▼16.90
Independent	Landolung	107	0.52%	New
Margin of victory		3,998	19.30%	▲11.05
Turnout		20,717	92.36%	▼0.11
Registered electors		22,431		▲3.90
SAP gain from INC		Swing	▲9.88	

=== 2000 Assembly election ===
2000 Manipur Legislative Assembly election: Henglep
Party	Candidate	Votes	%	±%
INC	T. Manga Vaiphei	5,409	27.09%	▲5.79
MSCP	T. Thangzalam Haokip	3,762	18.84%	▼24.74
SAP	Jainson Haokip	3,280	16.43%	New
RJD	Sehpu Haokip	3,268	16.37%	▲10.66
NCP	Thongsei Haokip	2,610	13.07%	New
Independent	Hejang Haokip	1,012	5.07%	New
FPM	Soineimang Vaiphei	257	1.29%	New
Margin of victory		1,647	8.25%	▼6.31
Turnout		19,964	92.47%	▲11.80
Registered electors		21,590		▲7.01
INC gain from MSCP		Swing	▼16.49	

=== 1998 Assembly by-election ===
1998 Manipur Legislative Assembly by-election: Henglep
Party	Candidate	Votes	%	±%
MSCP	T. Thangzalam Haokip	7,094	43.59%	New
KNA	Jainson Haokip	4,724	29.03%	▲14.95
INC	T. Manga Vaiphei	3,467	21.30%	▼8.07
RJD	Sehpu Haokip	929	5.71%	New
Margin of victory		2,370	14.56%	▲9.82
Turnout		16,275	84.09%	▼9.00
Registered electors		20,176		▲6.43
MSCP gain from JD		Swing	▲9.48	

=== 1995 Assembly election ===
1995 Manipur Legislative Assembly election: Henglep
Party	Candidate	Votes	%	±%
JD	Sehpu Haokip	5,798	34.11%	▲11.03
INC	T. Manga Vaiphei	4,992	29.37%	▲4.91
MPP	Thangzalam	3,085	18.15%	New
KNA	Jainson Haokip	2,392	14.07%	▼8.36
SAP	D. Angam	470	2.77%	New
Margin of victory		806	4.74%	▲0.09
Turnout		16,997	89.66%	▼3.71
Registered electors		18,957		▼11.34
JD gain from INS(SCS)		Swing	▲5.00	

=== 1990 Assembly election ===
1990 Manipur Legislative Assembly election: Henglep
Party	Candidate	Votes	%	±%
INS(SCS)	Holkhomang	5,813	29.12%	New
INC	Sehpu Haokip	4,884	24.46%	▼10.31
JD	Paokholal	4,608	23.08%	New
KNA	Jainson Haokip	4,478	22.43%	New
Margin of victory		929	4.65%	▼4.54
Turnout		19,965	93.37%	▲1.20
Registered electors		21,382		▲39.40
INS(SCS) gain from Independent		Swing	▼14.85	

=== 1984 Assembly election ===
1984 Manipur Legislative Assembly election: Henglep
Party	Candidate	Votes	%	±%
Independent	Sehpu Haokip	6,216	43.96%	New
INC	Holkhmoang	4,916	34.77%	New
Independent	Khaikap	1,549	10.96%	New
IC(S)	K. Mathew Kom	543	3.84%	New
Independent	Zonathan	325	2.30%	New
Independent	Hauneipao (Kenga)	93	0.66%	New
Margin of victory		1,300	9.19%	▲8.11
Turnout		14,139	92.18%	▲8.87
Registered electors		15,339		▼2.82
Independent hold		Swing	▲19.38	

=== 1980 Assembly election ===
1980 Manipur Legislative Assembly election: Henglep
Party	Candidate	Votes	%	±%
Independent	Holkhomang	3,233	24.59%	New
INC(I)	Mangkhothong	3,091	23.51%	New
Independent	Khaijang Haockip	1,728	13.14%	New
Independent	Hentinsong Vaiphei	1,693	12.88%	New
Independent	K. William Vaiphei	1,474	11.21%	New
KNA	N. Haoneikhup Vaiphei	1,456	11.07%	New
Margin of victory		142	1.08%	▼12.98
Turnout		13,149	83.31%	▼1.92
Registered electors		15,784		▲2.04
Independent gain from INC		Swing	▼31.05	

=== 1974 Assembly election ===
1974 Manipur Legislative Assembly election: Henglep
Party	Candidate	Votes	%	±%
INC	Holkhomang	7,335	55.64%	▲25.9
Independent	N. Hauneikhup	5,481	41.57%	New
Independent	Kamkhomang	69	0.52%	New
Margin of victory		1,854	14.06%	▼4.31
Turnout		13,184	85.23%	▲3.58
Registered electors		15,469		▲18.21
INC gain from Independent		Swing	▲7.53	

=== 1972 Assembly election ===
1972 Manipur Legislative Assembly election: Henglep
Party	Candidate	Votes	%	±%
Independent	Holkhomang	5,140	48.10%	New
INC	Lhingianeng Gangte	3,177	29.73%	New
Independent	L. Yamthang	1,362	12.75%	New
Independent	Mangkuothong	831	7.78%	New
Margin of victory		1,963	18.37%	
Turnout		10,685	81.65%	
Registered electors		13,086		
Independent win (new seat)				

== See also ==
- List of constituencies of the Manipur Legislative Assembly
- Churachandpur district
