= Lorho S. Pfoze =

Indian politician

Member of Parliament, Lok Sabha
- In office 23 May 2019 – 4 June 2024
- Preceded by: Thangso Baite
- Succeeded by: Alfred Kan-Ngam Arthur
- Constituency: Outer Manipur

Personal details
- Party: National People's Party (from 2025)
- Other political affiliations: Naga People's Front (till 2025)

Dr. Lorho S. Pfoze is an Indian politician from Manipur. In 2019 Indian general election Dr. Lorho as a candidate of Naga People's Front got elected as Member of Parliament, Lok Sabha in the Outer Manipur.
