= Rajkumar Ranjan Singh =

Member of the 17th Lok Sabha

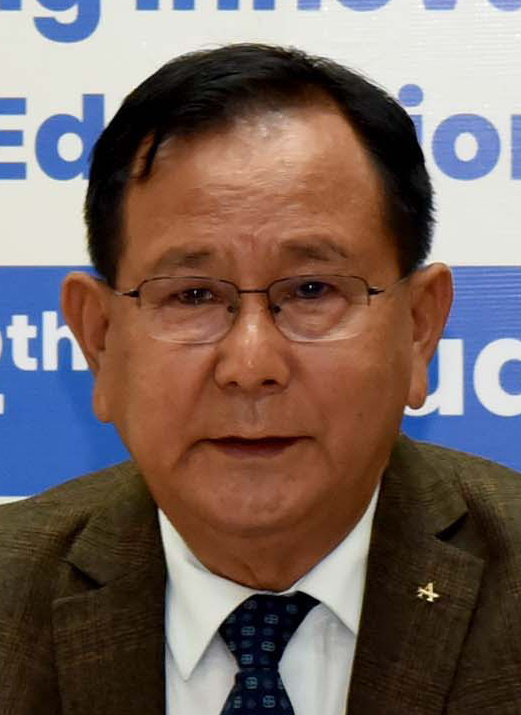
- Rajkumar Ranjan Singh in January 2022

Minister of State for External Affairs
- In office 7 July 2021 – 11 June 2024 Serving with V. Muraleedharan, Meenakshi Lekhi
- Prime Minister: Narendra Modi
- Minister: S. Jaishankar

Minister of State for Education
- In office 7 July 2021 – 11 June 2024 Serving with Subhas Sarkar, Annpurna Devi
- Prime Minister: Narendra Modi
- Minister: Dharmendra Pradhan

Member of Parliament, Lok Sabha
- In office 23 May 2019 – 11 June 2024
- Preceded by: Thokchom Meinya
- Succeeded by: Bimol Akoijam
- Constituency: Inner Manipur

Personal details
- Born: 1 September 1952 (age 73) Kongba, Manipur, India
- Party: Bharatiya Janata Party
- Spouse: Chungkham Debala Devi (m. 1984)
- Education: M.A. (Geography), B.T. & PhD
- Alma mater: Gauhati University
- Occupation: Teaching, Research
- As of July 7, 2021

Rajkumar Ranjan Singh (born 1 September 1952) is an Indian politician, teacher and researcher who served as a Member of Parliament, Lok Sabha representing the Inner Manipur constituency of Manipur from 2019 to 2024. He is a member of the Bharatiya Janata Party. He also served as the Minister of State for Ministry of Education and Ministry of External Affairs in Second Modi ministry from 2021 to 2024.
