= Bishnupur, Manipur Assembly constituency =

Legislative Assembly constituency in Manipur State, India

Coordinates: 24.63°N 93.76°E

Bishnupur
- Constituency for the Manipur Legislative Assembly

Constituency details
- Country: India
- Region: Northeast India
- State: Manipur
- District: Bishnupur
- Lok Sabha constituency: Inner Manipur
- Established: 1967
- Total electors: 32,115
- Reservation: None

Member of Legislative Assembly
- 12th Manipur Legislative Assembly
- Incumbent Govindas Konthoujam
- Party: Bharatiya Janata Party
- Elected year: 2022

Bishnupur is one of the 60 constituencies of the Manipur Legislative Assembly. It is one of the 32 constituencies forming the parliamentary constituency of Inner Manipur.

== Members of the Legislative Assembly ==
Year	Member	Party
1967	L. Ibomcha	Indian National Congress
1974	Khaidem Rath Singh	Indian National Congress
1980	Thiyam Udhop Singh	Indian National Congress
1984	Thiyam Udhop Singh	Independent
1990	Khundrakpam Jibon Singh	Janata Dal
1995	Govindas Konthoujam	Indian National Congress
2000	Govindas Konthoujam	Indian National Congress
2002	Govindas Konthoujam	Indian National Congress
2007	Govindas Konthoujam	Indian National Congress
2012	Govindas Konthoujam	Indian National Congress
2017	Govindas Konthoujam	Indian National Congress
2022	Govindas Konthoujam	Bharatiya Janata Party

== Election results ==
Vote share of winning candidates
2022	46.05%
2017	53.11%
2012	55.25%
2007	50.29%
2002	49.96%
2000	46.88%
1995	20.45%
1990	27.50%
1984	25.90%
1980	20.42%
1974	39.22%
1972	35.22%
1967	46.24%

=== 2027 Assembly election ===
2027 Manipur Legislative Assembly election: Bishnupur
Party	Candidate	Votes	%	±%
INC				
NDA				
NOTA	None of the above			
Majority				
Turnout				
gain from		Swing		

=== 2022 Assembly election ===
2022 Manipur Legislative Assembly election: Bishnupur
Party	Candidate	Votes	%	±%
BJP	Govindas Konthoujam	13,611	46.05%	12.75%
JD(U)	Oinam Nabakishore Singh	12,202	41.28%	
INC	Ningthoujam Joykumar Singh	3,395	11.49%	−41.63%
NOTA	Nota	350	1.18%	0.50%
Margin of victory		1,409	4.77%	−15.04%
Turnout		29,558	92.04%	1.91%
Registered electors		32,115		8.64%
BJP gain from INC		Swing	-7.07%	

=== 2017 Assembly election ===
2017 Manipur Legislative Assembly election: Bishnupur
Party	Candidate	Votes	%	±%
INC	Govindas Konthoujam	14,150	53.11%	−2.14%
BJP	Konthoujamkrishna Kumar Singh	8,872	33.30%	31.36%
LJP	Khundrakpambhabeshwor Singh	3,333	12.51%	
NOTA	None of the Above	181	0.68%	
Margin of victory		5,278	19.81%	−7.81%
Turnout		26,641	90.13%	3.57%
Registered electors		29,560		6.23%
INC hold		Swing	-2.14%	

=== 2012 Assembly election ===
2012 Manipur Legislative Assembly election: Bishnupur
Party	Candidate	Votes	%	±%
INC	Govindas Konthoujam	13,308	55.25%	4.96%
MSCP	Thiyam Yaima	6,655	27.63%	
AITC	Khundrakpamjibon	2,189	9.09%	
MPP	Ningthoujam Sanajaoba	1,291	5.36%	−27.62%
BJP	Pukhrambam Kumarjeet	467	1.94%	
Margin of victory		6,653	27.62%	10.31%
Turnout		24,085	86.54%	−1.04%
Registered electors		27,826		1.50%
INC hold		Swing	4.96%	

=== 2007 Assembly election ===
2007 Manipur Legislative Assembly election: Bishnupur
Party	Candidate	Votes	%	±%
INC	Govindas Konthoujam	12,077	50.29%	49.36%
MPP	Ningthoujam Sanajaoba Singh	7,919	32.98%	
NCP	Khundrakpamjibon Singh	3,898	16.23%	
SP	Nongmaithem Dhiren Singh	120	0.50%	
Margin of victory		4,158	17.31%	11.39%
Turnout		24,014	87.59%	−4.31%
Registered electors		27,415		15.27%
INC gain from MSCP		Swing	0.33%	

=== 2002 Assembly election ===
2002 Manipur Legislative Assembly election: Bishnupur
Party	Candidate	Votes	%	±%
MSCP	Govindas Konthoujam	10,833	49.96%	3.08%
DRPP	Ningthoujam Sanajaoba Singh	9,548	44.04%	
CPI	Sorokhaibam Nilkamal Singh	698	3.22%	
BJP	Pukhrambam Goverdhon Singh	285	1.31%	−30.79%
INC	Thiyam Chandrakanta Singh	202	0.93%	
SAP	Rajkumar Bimolchandra Singh	116	0.54%	
Margin of victory		1,285	5.93%	−8.86%
Turnout		21,682	91.90%	−3.07%
Registered electors		23,784		6.08%
MSCP hold		Swing	29.51%	

=== 2000 Assembly election ===
2000 Manipur Legislative Assembly election: Bishnupur
Party	Candidate	Votes	%	±%
MSCP	Govindas Konthoujam	9,821	46.88%	
BJP	Ningthoujam Sanajaoba Singh	6,724	32.10%	14.41%
MPP	Khundrakpamjibon Singh	4,402	21.01%	5.69%
Margin of victory		3,097	14.78%	13.61%
Turnout		20,947	94.38%	−0.59%
Registered electors		22,420		13.84%
MSCP gain from INC		Swing	26.44%	

=== 1995 Assembly election ===
1995 Manipur Legislative Assembly election: Bishnupur
Party	Candidate	Votes	%	±%
INC	Govindas Konthoujam	3,766	20.45%	−2.33%
JD	Khundrakpamjibon Singh	3,550	19.28%	
BJP	Khundrakpampulinkant	3,258	17.69%	−5.21%
FPM	Braj Mohon	2,949	16.01%	
MPP	Pukhrambam Indramani	2,822	15.32%	−4.39%
SJP(R)	Pukhrambam Goverdhon	809	4.39%	
CPI	Sorokhaibam Nilakomol	741	4.02%	−2.82%
Independent	Ningthoujam Mangi	522	2.83%	
Margin of victory		216	1.17%	−3.42%
Turnout		18,417	94.97%	3.69%
Registered electors		19,695		5.01%
INC gain from JD		Swing	-7.05%	

=== 1990 Assembly election ===
1990 Manipur Legislative Assembly election: Bishnupur
Party	Candidate	Votes	%	±%
JD	Khundrakpamjibon Singh	4,654	27.50%	
BJP	Khundrakpampulinkant Singh	3,876	22.90%	
INC	Thiyam Udhob Singh	3,856	22.78%	0.74%
MPP	R. K. Dhanachandra Singh	3,336	19.71%	
CPI	Gurumayum Nilamani Sharma	1,159	6.85%	
Margin of victory		778	4.60%	2.72%
Turnout		16,926	91.29%	−2.48%
Registered electors		18,755		24.05%
JD gain from Independent		Swing	1.60%	

=== 1984 Assembly election ===
1984 Manipur Legislative Assembly election: Bishnupur
Party	Candidate	Votes	%	±%
Independent	Thiyam Udhop Singh	3,584	25.90%	
JP	R. K. Dhanachandra Singh	3,324	24.02%	
INC	Khundrakpampulinkant Singh	3,050	22.04%	
Independent	Laishram Heramot Singh	2,125	15.36%	
Independent	Thokchom Sanat Kumar Sinha	1,756	12.69%	
Margin of victory		260	1.88%	−0.33%
Turnout		13,839	93.77%	6.72%
Registered electors		15,119		4.05%
Independent gain from INC(U)		Swing	5.48%	

=== 1980 Assembly election ===
1980 Manipur Legislative Assembly election: Bishnupur
Party	Candidate	Votes	%	±%
INC(U)	Khundrakpampulinkant Singh	2,531	20.42%	
Independent	Konthoujamgojendro Singh	2,257	18.21%	
JP	R. K. Dhanachandra Singh	1,621	13.08%	
INC(I)	Thiyam Udhob Singh	1,554	12.54%	
Independent	Akhijam Ketuki Singh	1,311	10.58%	
CPI	Khomdram Chanu Bilashini	1,245	10.05%	
JP(S)	Ningthoujam Mangi Singh	1,058	8.54%	
Independent	Sougaijam Tomba Singh	605	4.88%	
MPP	Ningthojam Dhananjoy	171	1.38%	−30.17%
Margin of victory		274	2.21%	−5.46%
Turnout		12,393	87.05%	−0.54%
Registered electors		14,530		30.17%
INC(U) gain from INC		Swing	-18.80%	

=== 1974 Assembly election ===
1974 Manipur Legislative Assembly election: Bishnupur
Party	Candidate	Votes	%	±%
INC	Khaidem Rath Singh	3,739	39.22%	4.00%
MPP	Mairembam Nilachandra Singh	3,008	31.55%	12.27%
Socialist Labour Party (India)	Akoijam Ketuki Singh	2,786	29.22%	
Margin of victory		731	7.67%	−1.60%
Turnout		9,533	87.59%	7.81%
Registered electors		11,162		−3.66%
INC hold		Swing	4.00%	

=== 1972 Assembly election ===
1972 Manipur Legislative Assembly election: Bishnupur
Party	Candidate	Votes	%	±%
INC	Khaidem Ratha	3,170	35.22%	−11.02%
Socialist Labour Party (India)	Akoijam Ketuko	2,336	25.95%	
CPI	Sougaijam Tomba	1,759	19.54%	
MPP	Mairembam Nilachandra	1,736	19.29%	
Margin of victory		834	9.27%	−10.37%
Turnout		9,001	79.79%	4.75%
Registered electors		11,586		−33.19%
INC hold		Swing	-11.02%	

=== 1967 Assembly election ===
1967 Manipur Legislative Assembly election: Bishnupur
Party	Candidate	Votes	%	±%
INC	L. Ibomcha	5,784	46.24%	
SSP	A. Ketuki	3,327	26.59%	
Independent	M. Nilachandra	3,220	25.74%	
Independent	S. Angouba	179	1.43%	
Margin of victory		2,457	19.64%	
Turnout		12,510	75.03%	
Registered electors		17,343		
INC win (new seat)				

== See also ==
- List of constituencies of the Manipur Legislative Assembly
- Bishnupur district
