= Outer Manipur Lok Sabha constituency =

Constituency of the Indian parliament in Manipur

Coordinates: 25.15°N 93.97°E

Outer Manipur MN-2
- Lok Sabha constituency
- Location of Manipur in India

Constituency details
- Country: India
- Region: Northeast India
- State: Manipur
- Assembly constituencies: 28: Heirok, Wangjing Tentha, Khangabok, Wabgai, Kakching, Hiyanglam, Sugnu, Jiribam, Chandel, Tengnoupal, Phungyar, Ukhrul, Chingai, Saikul, Karong, Mao, Tadubi, Kangpokpi, Saitu, Tamei, Tamenglong, Nungba, Tipaimukh, Thanlon, Henglep, Churachandpur, Saikot and Singhat
- Established: 1952
- Reservation: ST

Member of Parliament
- 18th Lok Sabha
- Incumbent Alfred Kan-Ngam Arthur
- Party: INC
- Alliance: INDIA
- Elected year: 2024

Outer Manipur Lok Sabha constituency is one of the two Lok Sabha (parliamentary) constituencies in Manipur, a state in northeastern India. The seat is reserved for scheduled tribes.

== Assembly segments ==
Outer Manipur Lok Sabha constituency is composed of the following assembly segments:

| No | Name | Reservation | District | MLA | Party | 2024 Lead |
|---|---|---|---|---|---|---|
| 33 | Heirok | None | Thoubal | T. Radheshyam Singh | BJP | INC |
| 34 | Wangjing Tentha | None | Thoubal | Paonam Brojen | BJP | INC |
| 35 | Khangabok | None | Thoubal | Surjakumar Okram | INC | INC |
| 36 | Wabgai | None | Thoubal | Usham Deben Singh | BJP | INC |
| 37 | Kakching | None | Thoubal | M. Rameshwar Singh | NPP | INC |
| 38 | Hiyanglam | None | Thoubal | Yumnam Radheshyam | BJP | NPF |
| 39 | Sugnu | None | Thoubal | Kangujam Ranjit Singh | INC | NPF |
| 40 | Jiribam | None | Jiribam | Ashab Uddin | BJP | INC |
| 41 | Chandel | ST | Chandel | Olish Shilshi | BJP | NPF |
| 42 | Tengnoupal | ST | Chandel | Letpao Haokip | BJP | NPF |
| 43 | Phungyar | ST | Ukhrul | Leishiyo Keishing | NPF | NPF |
| 44 | Ukhrul | ST | Ukhrul | Ram Muivah | NPF | NPF |
| 45 | Chingai | ST | Ukhrul | Khashim Vashum | NPF | NPF |
| 46 | Saikul | ST | Senapati | K. Haokip Hangshing | KPA | INC |
| 47 | Karong | ST | Senapati | J. Kumo Sha | IND | IND |
| 48 | Mao | ST | Senapati | Losii Dikho | NPF | IND |
| 49 | Tadubi | ST | Senapati | Vacant (Note: Tadubi MLA N. Kayisii died on 18 January 2025) | | NPF |
| 50 | Kangpokpi | None | Senapati | Nemcha Kipgen | BJP | NPF |
| 51 | Saitu | ST | Senapati | Haokholet Kipgen | IND | NPF |
| 52 | Tamei | ST | Tamenglong | Awangbow Newmai | NPF | NPF |
| 53 | Tamenglong | ST | Tamenglong | Janghemlung Panmei | NPP | NPF |
| 54 | Nungba | ST | Tamenglong | Dinganglung Gangmei | BJP | NPF |
| 55 | Tipaimukh | ST | Churachandpur | Ngursanglur Sanate | BJP | INC |
| 56 | Thanlon | ST | Churachandpur | Vacant (Note: Thanlon MLA Vungzagin Valte died on 20 February 2026) | | INC |
| 57 | Henglep | ST | Churachandpur | Letzamang Haokip | BJP | INC |
| 58 | Churachandpur | ST | Churachandpur | L. M. Khaute | BJP | INC |
| 59 | Saikot | ST | Churachandpur | Paolienlal Haokip | BJP | INC |
| 60 | Singhat | ST | Churachandpur | Chinlunthang Manlun | KPA | INC |

== Members of Parliament ==
| Election | Member | Party |
|---|---|---|
| 1952 | Rishang Keishing | Socialist Party |
| 1957 | Rungsung Suisa | Indian National Congress |
| 1962 | Rishang Keishing | Socialist Party |
| 1967 | Paokai Haokip | Indian National Congress |
| 1971 | Paokai Haokip | Indian National Congress |
| 1977 | Yangmaso Shaiza | Indian National Congress |
| 1980 | N. Gouzagin | Indian National Congress |
| 1984 | Meijinlung Kamson | Indian National Congress |
| 1989 | Meijinlung Kamson | Indian National Congress |
| 1991 | Meijinlung Kamson | Indian National Congress |
| 1996 | Meijinlung Kamson | Indian National Congress |
| 1998 | Kim Gangte | Communist Party of India |
| 1999 | Holkhomang Haokip | Nationalist Congress Party |
| 2004 | Mani Charenamei | Independent |
| 2009 | Thangso Baite | Indian National Congress |
| 2014 | Thangso Baite | Indian National Congress |
| 2019 | Lorho S. Pfoze | Naga People's Front |
| 2024 | Alfred Kan-Ngam Arthur | Indian National Congress |

== Election results ==
Vote share of Winning candidates
| 2024 | 48.32% |
| 2019 | 42.27% |
| 2014 | 38.35% |
| 2009 | 45.56% |
| 2004 | 37.09% |
| 1999 | 26.73% |
| 1998 | 30.54% |
| 1996 | 48.25% |
| 1991 | 36.86% |
| 1989 | 49.52% |
| 1984 | 45.93% |
| 1980 | 30.87% |
| 1977 | 48.32% |
| 1971 | 30.85% |
| 1967 | 26.25% |
| 1962 | 29.85% |
| 1957 | 26.24% |
| 1952 | 30.46% |

=== 2024 ===
2024 Indian general election: Outer Manipur
| Party | Candidate | Votes | % | ±% |
|---|---|---|---|---|
| INC | Alfred Kan-Ngam Arthur | 384,954 | 48.32 | ▲30.55 |
| NPF | Kachui Timothy Zimik | 2,99,536 | 37.60 | ▼4.77 |
| IND | S Kho John | 89,910 | 11.28 | N/A |
| IND | Alyson Abonmai | 15,110 | 1.90 | N/A |
| NOTA | None of the above | 7,225 | 0.91 | ▲0.59 |
| Majority | | 85,418 | 10.72 | ▲2.14 |
| Turnout | | 7,96,735 | 76.15 | |
| INC gain from NPF | | Swing | | |

=== 2019 ===
2019 Indian general election: Outer Manipur (ST)
| Party | Candidate | Votes | % | ±% |
|---|---|---|---|---|
| NPF | Lorho S. Pfoze | 363,527 | 42.27 | |
| BJP | Houlim Shokhopao Mate | 289,745 | 33.69 | |
| INC | K. James | 152,510 | 17.73 | |
| NPP | Thangminlien Kipgen | 30,726 | 3.57 | |
| NEINDP (Note: North East India Development Party) | Ashang Kasar | 12,211 | 1.42 | |
| JD(U) | Hangkhanpau Taithul | 2,987 | 0.35 | |
| NCP | Angam Karung Kom | 2,552 | 0.30 | |
| IND | Leikhan Kaipu | 996 | 0.12 | |
| NOTA | None of the Above | 2,775 | 0.32 | |
| Majority | | 73,782 | 8.58 | |
| Turnout | | 858,029 | 83.95 | |
| Swing to NPF from INC | | Swing | | |

=== 2014 ===
2014 Indian general election: Outer Manipur (ST)
| Party | Candidate | Votes | % | ±% |
|---|---|---|---|---|
| INC | Thangso Baite | 296,770 | 38.35 | |
| NPF | Soso Lorho | 281,133 | 36.33 | |
| BJP | Gangmumei Kamei | 75,828 | 9.80 | |
| NCP | Chungkhokai Doungel | 61,662 | 7.97 | |
| IND | Mani Charenamei | 34,995 | 4.52 | |
| AITC | Kim Gangte | 12,752 | 1.65 | |
| AAP | M. Khamchinpau @ K. Zou | 4,331 | 0.56 | |
| JD(U) | Lamminlien @ Lien Gangte | 1,085 | 0.14 | |
| IND | Lamlalmoi @ Momoi Gangte | 603 | 0.08 | |
| IND | Amarson Sankhil | 401 | 0.05 | |
| NOTA | None of the Above | 2,206 | 0.29 | |
| Majority | | 15,637 | 2.02 | |
| Turnout | | 771,766 | 83.98 | |
| INC hold | | Swing | | |

=== 2009 ===
2009 Indian general election: Outer Manipur (ST)
| Party | Candidate | Votes | % | ±% |
|---|---|---|---|---|
| INC | Thangso Baite | 344,517 | 45.56 | |
| PDA | Mani Charenamei | 224,719 | 29.72 | |
| BJP | D. Loli Adanee | 93,052 | 12.31 | |
| NCP | L. B. Sona | 79,849 | 10.56 | |
| RJD | M. Yamkhongam Haokip | 4,859 | 0.64 | |
| IND | Valley Rose Hungyo | 4,735 | 0.63 | |
| LJP | Thangkhangin | 1,252 | 0.17 | |
| IND | Mangshi (Rose Mangshi Haokip) | 1,128 | 0.15 | |
| IND | Lamlalmoi Gangte | 2,070 | 0.27 | |
| Majority | | 119,798 | 15.84 | |
| Turnout | | 756,181 | 83.14 | |
| Swing to INC from Independent | | Swing | | |

=== 2004 ===
2004 Indian general election: Outer Manipur (ST)
| Party | Candidate | Votes | % | ±% |
|---|---|---|---|---|
| IND | Mani Charenamei | 229,634 | 37.09 | |
| BJP | D. Loli Adanee | 147,441 | 23.81 | |
| NCP | Holkhomang Haokip | 107,435 | 17.35 | |
| MPP | Kim Gangte | 77,055 | 12.45 | |
| JD(U) | Rosangzuala | 37,455 | 6.05 | |
| AITC | W. Morung Makunga | 20,131 | 3.25 | |
| Majority | | 82,193 | 13.28 | |
| Turnout | | 619,151 | | |
| Swing to Independent from NCP | | Swing | | |

=== 1999 ===
1999 Indian general election: Outer Manipur (ST)
| Party | Candidate | Votes | % | ±% |
|---|---|---|---|---|
| NCP | Holkhomang | 120,559 | 26.73 | |
| INC | R. K. Theko | 91,750 | 20.35 | |
| MSCP | Soso Lorho | 69,030 | 15.31 | |
| IND | Thang Khan Gin | 57,679 | 12.79 | |
| CPI | Doctor T. S. Gangte | 35,337 | 7.84 | |
| JD(U) | Kim Gangte | 28,507 | 6.32 | |
| FPM | Gaidon Kamei | 21,689 | 4.81 | |
| RJD | Selkai Hrangchal | 15,645 | 3.47 | |
| BJP | Meijinlung Kamson | 9,110 | 2.02 | |
| AJBP (Note: Ajeya Bharat Party) | Thangkhanpau | 1,013 | 0.22 | |
| IND | Dr. Ashikho Daili Mao | 643 | 0.14 | |
| Majority | | 28,809 | 6.38 | |
| Turnout | | 454,615 | 63.63 | |
| Swing to NCP from CPI | | Swing | | |

=== 1998 ===
1998 Indian general election: Outer Manipur (ST)
| Party | Candidate | Votes | % | ±% |
|---|---|---|---|---|
| CPI | Kim Gangte | 97,012 | 30.54 | |
| BJP | Hokkhomang Haokip | 94,543 | 29.76 | |
| MSCP | Soso Lorho | 58,386 | 18.38 | |
| RJD | Selkai Hrangchal | 32,318 | 10.17 | |
| INC | Meijinlung Kamson | 30,986 | 9.75 | |
| SAP | P. T. Yamthang Haokip | 4,414 | 1.39 | |
| Majority | | 2,469 | 0.78 | |
| Turnout | | 319,829 | 46.37 | |
| Swing to CPI from INC | | Swing | | |

=== 1996 ===
1996 Indian general election: Outer Manipur (ST)
| Party | Candidate | Votes | % | ±% |
|---|---|---|---|---|
| INC | Meijinlung Kamson | 265,325 | 48.25 | |
| IND | Kimneilhing Gangte | 197,217 | 35.87 | |
| FPM | Shimreingam Shaiza | 37,264 | 6.78 | |
| AIIC(T) | S. Lorho | 24,500 | 4.46 | |
| BJP | Asoso Yonuo | 7,432 | 1.35 | |
| IC(S) | Mangkhum | 6,540 | 1.19 | |
| SAP | Valley Rose Hungyo | 6,058 | 1.10 | |
| IND | Thangkhangin | 2,634 | 0.48 | |
| IND | Lalthangsang | 1,360 | 0.25 | |
| IND | Paokhogin Kipgen | 1,137 | 0.21 | |
| IND | Jamhem Milhiem | 413 | 0.08 | |
| Majority | | 68,108 | 12.39 | |
| Turnout | | 554,047 | 83.40 | |
| INC hold | | Swing | | |

=== 1991 ===
1991 Indian general election: Outer Manipur (ST)
| Party | Candidate | Votes | % | ±% |
|---|---|---|---|---|
| INC | Meijinlung Kamson | 176,428 | 36.86 | |
| JD | R. Luikham | 157,059 | 32.82 | |
| INS(SCS) | Seikhogin (Paginkipgen) | 92,583 | 19.34 | |
| BJP | Asoso Yunou | 26,577 | 5.55 | |
| IND | P. Gangte (Paocha) | 19,957 | 4.17 | |
| JP | Ashikho Daili (Mao) | 3,941 | 0.82 | |
| NPP (Note: Nagaland Peoples Party) | Seikhodao | 1,108 | 0.23 | |
| IND | Loli Mao | 685 | 0.14 | |
| IND | Holpao | 274 | 0.06 | |
| Majority | | 19,369 | 4.04 | |
| Turnout | | 482,286 | 77.71 | |
| INC hold | | Swing | | |

=== 1989 ===
1989 Indian general election: Outer Manipur (ST)
| Party | Candidate | Votes | % | ±% |
|---|---|---|---|---|
| INC | Meijinlung Kamson | 233,150 | 49.52 | |
| KNA | P. Gante | 108,085 | 22.96 | |
| IND | Sheli | 89,266 | 18.96 | |
| INS(SCS) | Shimreingam Shaiza | 31,530 | 6.70 | |
| JD | H. Valley Rose | 8,823 | 1.87 | |
| Majority | | 125,065 | 26.56 | |
| Turnout | | 477,354 | 77.38 | |
| INC hold | | Swing | | |

=== 1984 ===
1984 Indian general election: Outer Manipur (ST)
| Party | Candidate | Votes | % | ±% |
|---|---|---|---|---|
| INC | Meijinlung | 189,911 | 45.93 | |
| MPP | Lhingzaneng | 149,019 | 36.04 | |
| IND | Angking Khumlo | 44,711 | 10.81 | |
| IND | L. Solomon | 22,783 | 5.51 | |
| LKD | Leishisan | 7,031 | 1.70 | |
| Majority | | 40,892 | 9.89 | |
| Turnout | | 427,817 | 85.57 | |
| Swing to INC from INC(I) | | Swing | | |

=== 1980 ===
1980 Indian general election: Outer Manipur (ST)
| Party | Candidate | Votes | % | ±% |
|---|---|---|---|---|
| INC(I) | Gouzagin | 106,749 | 30.87 | |
| JP | Kaiho | 84,423 | 24.41 | |
| INC(U) | Shehkhogin Kipgen | 82,866 | 23.96 | |
| IND | K. Prongo | 60,794 | 17.58 | |
| IND | Paokai | 10,969 | 3.17 | |
| Majority | | 22,326 | 6.46 | |
| Turnout | | 361,549 | 82.18 | |
| Swing to INC(I) from INC | | Swing | | |

=== 1977 ===
1977 Indian general election: Outer Manipur (ST)
| Party | Candidate | Votes | % | ±% |
|---|---|---|---|---|
| INC | Yangmaso Shaiza | 105,111 | 48.32 | |
| MPP | Sehkhogin | 29,049 | 13.35 | |
| IND | Khaijang | 23,777 | 10.93 | |
| CPI | Thangkhanpau Guite | 20,609 | 9.47 | |
| IND | Pukeho Lokho | 15,994 | 7.35 | |
| IND | Meijinlung | 12,159 | 5.59 | |
| JP | L. Solomon | 10,849 | 4.99 | |
| Majority | | 76,062 | 34.97 | |
| Turnout | | 222,264 | 58.44 | |
| INC hold | | Swing | | |

=== 1971 ===
1971 Indian general election: Outer Manipur (ST)
| Party | Candidate | Votes | % | ±% |
|---|---|---|---|---|
| INC | Paokai | 37,041 | 30.85 | |
| IND | Rishang | 34,999 | 29.15 | |
| IND | Yangmaso Shaiza | 32,337 | 26.93 | |
| INC(O) | Gougin | 15,700 | 13.07 | |
| Majority | | 2,042 | 1.70 | |
| Turnout | | 123,090 | 47.82 | |
| Swing to INC from Independent | | Swing | | |

=== 1967 ===
1967 Indian general election: Outer Manipur (ST)
| Party | Candidate | Votes | % | ±% |
|---|---|---|---|---|
| IND | P. Haokip | 30,403 | 26.25 | |
| INC | Rishang | 28,862 | 24.91 | |
| IND | Goujagin | 19,350 | 16.70 | |
| SSP | A. Longmei | 18,411 | 15.89 | |
| IND | Meijeinlung | 13,258 | 11.44 | |
| IND | R. Sena | 5,558 | 4.80 | |
| Majority | | 1,541 | 1.34 | |
| Turnout | | 120,008 | 54.66 | |
| Swing to Independent from Socialist | | Swing | | |

=== 1962 ===
1962 Indian general election: Outer Manipur (ST)
| Party | Candidate | Votes | % | ±% |
|---|---|---|---|---|
| Socialist | Rishang | 35,621 | 29.85 | |
| INC | Sibo Larho | 35,579 | 29.82 | |
| IND | Vungkhom | 18,898 | 15.84 | |
| IND | Chungkhokai Doungel | 15,927 | 13.35 | |
| IND | T. Gougin | 13,305 | 11.15 | |
| Majority | | 42 | 0.03 | |
| Turnout | | 119,402 | 62.10 | |
| Swing to Socialist from INC | | Swing | | |

=== 1957 ===
1957 Indian general election: Outer Manipur (ST)
| Party | Candidate | Votes | % | ±% |
|---|---|---|---|---|
| INC | Rungsung Suisa | 21,316 | 26.24 | |
| IND | Athikho Deho | 20,302 | 24.99 | |
| IND | Risang | 17,307 | 21.30 | |
| IND | Paokhohang | 13,534 | 16.66 | |
| IND | H. Tualvung | 5,178 | 6.37 | |
| PSP | Teba Kilong | 3,610 | 4.44 | |
| Majority | | 1,014 | 1.25 | |
| Turnout | | 81,247 | 49.77 | |
| Swing to INC from Socialist | | Swing | | |

=== 1952 ===
1952 Indian general election: Outer Manipur
| Party | Candidate | Votes | % | ±% |
|---|---|---|---|---|
| Socialist | Rishang | 23,625 | 30.46 | |
| AMN (Note: All Manipur National Union) | Suisa | 18,271 | 23.56 | |
| INC | Kampu | 13,415 | 17.30 | |
| KNA (Note: Kuki National Association) | Lunah | 12,155 | 15.67 | |
| PP (Note: Praja Party) | Teba Kilong | 10,095 | 13.02 | |
| Majority | | 5,354 | 6.90 | |
| Turnout | | 77,561 | 52.08 | |
| Socialist win (new seat) | | | | |

== See also ==
- List of constituencies of the Lok Sabha
