= Indian Congress (Socialist) – Sarat Chandra Sinha =

- Abbreviation: ICS(SCS)
- Founder: Sarat Chandra Sinha
- Founded: 1984
- Split from: Indian Congress (Socialist)
- Merged into: Nationalist Congress Party
- ECI status: Dissolved Party

Election symbol
- Wheel

Indian Congress (Socialist) – Sarat Chandra Sinha (ICS(SCS)) was a political party in India between 1984 and 1999. The party was formed through a split in the Indian Congress (Socialist), and was led by former Assam Chief Minister (1971–78), Sarat Chandra Sinha.

This faction merged with Sharad Pawar's Nationalist Congress Party in 1999.

== See also ==
- Indian National Congress breakaway parties
