= Tipaimukh Assembly constituency =

Legislative Assembly constituency in Manipur State, India

Coordinates: 24.236°N 93.025°E

Tipaimukh
- Constituency for the Manipur Legislative Assembly

Constituency details
- Country: India
- Region: Northeast India
- State: Manipur
- District: Pherzawl
- Lok Sabha constituency: Outer Manipur
- Established: 1972
- Total electors: 18,606
- Reservation: ST

Member of Legislative Assembly
- 12th Manipur Legislative Assembly
- Incumbent Ngursanglur Sanate
- Party: Bharatiya Janata Party
- Elected year: 2022

Tipaimukh is one of the 60 Vidhan Sabha constituencies in the Indian state of Manipur.

== Members of Assembly ==
Year	Member	Party
1972	Ngurdinglien Sanate	Independent politician
1974	Ngurdinglien	Indian National Congress
1980	Ngurdinglien Sanate	Indian National Congress
1984	Ngurdinglien Sanate	Independent politician
1990	Selkai Hrangchal	Janata Dal
1995	Dr. Chaltonlien Amo	Indian National Congress
2000	Ngursanglur Sanate	Nationalist Congress Party
2002	Dr. Chaltonlien Amo	Indian National Congress
2007	Ngursanglur Sanate	Rashtriya Janata Dal
2012	Dr. Chaltonlien Amo	Indian National Congress
2017	Dr. Chaltonlien Amo	Indian National Congress
2022	Ngursanglur Sanate	Bharatiya Janata Party

== Election results ==
=== 2027 Assembly election ===
2027 Manipur Legislative Assembly election: Tipaimukh
Party	Candidate	Votes	%	±%
INC				
NDA				
NOTA	None of the above			
Majority				
Turnout				
gain from		Swing		

=== 2022 ===
2022 Manipur Legislative Assembly Election: 55 Tipaimukh A/C
Party	Candidate	Votes	%	±%
JD(U)	Ngursanglur Sanate	6,267	49.24%	
BJP	Dr. Chaltonlien Amo	5,018	39.42%	
NPEP	Thangthatling Sinate	1,315	10.33%	
NOTA	None Of The Above	128	1.01%	
Majority				
Turnout				
Registered electors				

=== 2017 ===
2017 Manipur Legislative Assembly Election: 55 Tipaimukh A/C
Party	Candidate	Votes	%	±%
INC	Dr. Chaltonlien Amo	4,997	42.44%	
BJP	Dr. Lallukhum Fimate	4371	37.13%	
NPP	Ngursanglur Sanate	2167	18.41%	
Independent	Ngurrivung	132	1.12%	
Independent	Thangthatling Sinate	106	0.9%	
NOTA	None Of The Above	25	0.21%	
Majority				
Turnout				
Registered electors		17,862		

=== 2012 ===
2012 Manipur Legislative Assembly Election: 55 Tipaimukh A/C
Party	Candidate	Votes	%	±%
RJD	Ngursanglur Sanate	4,946	39.61%	
INC	Dr. Chaltonlien Amo	4,622	37.01%	
Majority				
Turnout				
Registered electors		17,862		

=== 2007 ===
2007 Manipur Legislative Assembly Election: 55 Tipaimukh A/C
Party	Candidate	Votes	%	±%
RJD	Nursanglur Sanate	4,946	39.61%	
INC	Dr. Chaltonlien Amo	4,622	37.09%	
Majority				
Turnout				
Registered electors		17,862		

== See also ==
- Churachandpur district
- Manipur Legislative Assembly
- List of constituencies of Manipur Legislative Assembly
