= Mani Charenamei =

Indian politician (born 1959)

MP
- Constituency: Outer Manipur

Personal details
- Born: 10 February 1959 (age 67) Senapati, Manipur
- Party: Independent
- Spouse: Lois Panmei
- Children: 1 son and 2 daughters
- As of 16 September, 2006

Mani Charenamei (born 10 February 1959) was a member of the 14th Lok Sabha of India. He represents the Outer Manipur constituency of Manipur.
