= Thanlon Assembly constituency =

Legislative Assembly constituency in Manipur State, India

Coordinates: 24.27°N 93.28°E

Thanlon
- Constituency for the Manipur Legislative Assembly

Constituency details
- Country: India
- Region: Northeast India
- State: Manipur
- District: Pherzawl
- Lok Sabha constituency: Outer Manipur
- Established: 1967
- Total electors: 18,042
- Reservation: ST

Member of Legislative Assembly
- 12th Manipur Legislative Assembly
- Incumbent Vacant

Thanlon is one of the 60 Legislative Assembly constituencies of Manipur state in India.

It is part of Churachandpur district and is reserved for candidates belonging to the Scheduled Tribes.

== Members of the Legislative Assembly ==
Year	Member	Party
1967	Goukhenpao	Indian National Congress
1972	N. Gouzagin	Independent politician
1974	N. Gouzagin	Manipur Hills Union
1980	T. Phungzathang	Indian National Congress
1984	T. Phungzathang	Indian National Congress
1990	T. Phungzathang	Indian National Congress
1995	Songchinkhup	Manipur Peoples Party
2000	Songchinkhup	Manipur State Congress Party
2002	Songchinkhup	Indian National Congress
2007	V. Hangkhanlian	Manipur People's Party
2012	Vungzagin Valte	Indian National Congress
2017	Vungzagin Valte	Bharatiya Janata Party
2022	Vungzagin Valte	Bharatiya Janata Party

== Election results ==
Vote share of winning candidates
2022	36.45%
2017	71.25%
2012	43.30%
2007	49.36%
2002	36.28%
2000	57.81%
1995	45.97%
1990	47.96%
1984	42.38%
1980	49.88%
1974	53.14%
1972	51.27%
1967	31.87%

=== 2027 Assembly election ===
2027 Manipur Legislative Assembly election: Thanlon
Party	Candidate	Votes	%	±%
INC				
NDA				
NOTA	None of the above			
Majority				
Turnout				
gain from		Swing		

=== Assembly Election 2022 ===
2022 Manipur Legislative Assembly election: Thanlon
Party	Candidate	Votes	%	±%
BJP	Vungzagin Valte	4,863	36.45%	−34.80%
NPP	Khanthang Tonsing	4,112	30.82%	
Independent	Langkhanpau Guite	2,789	20.91%	
JD(U)	Thangkhosei Guite	797	5.97%	
SS	Lalhlunsang Sungte	658	4.93%	
Lok Janshakti Party(Ram Vilas)	Thangkhangin	71	0.53%	
Margin of victory		751	5.63%	−46.75%
Turnout		13,340	73.94%	−1.78%
Registered electors		18,042		−0.19%
BJP hold		Swing	-34.80%	

=== Assembly Election 2017 ===
2017 Manipur Legislative Assembly election: Thanlon
Party	Candidate	Votes	%	±%
BJP	Vungzagin Valte	9,752	71.25%	
INC	Chinkholal Thangsing	2,583	18.87%	−24.43%
LJP	Thangkhangin	795	5.81%	
NPP	T. Nengzakham Tombing	413	3.02%	
Independent	P. Khamsanglian	107	0.78%	
Margin of victory		7,169	52.38%	48.76%
Turnout		13,687	75.72%	32.09%
Registered electors		18,076		−2.04%
BJP gain from INC		Swing	27.95%	

=== Assembly Election 2012 ===
2012 Manipur Legislative Assembly election: Thanlon
Party	Candidate	Votes	%	±%
INC	Vungzagin Valte	3,486	43.30%	40.62%
NPP	V. Hangkhanlian	3,195	39.69%	
CPI	Tuanzalian	962	11.95%	4.56%
NCP	K. Chinkhansuan	233	2.89%	−6.08%
AITC	Thangkholal Thangsing	103	1.28%	
Jai Maha Bharath Party	T. Nengzakham Tombing	71	0.88%	
Margin of victory		291	3.61%	−34.79%
Turnout		8,050	43.63%	−37.09%
Registered electors		18,452		−4.46%
INC gain from NPP		Swing	-6.06%	

=== Assembly Election 2007 ===
2007 Manipur Legislative Assembly election: Thanlon
Party	Candidate	Votes	%	±%
MPP	V. Hangkhanlian	7,695	49.36%	
BJP	Zabiaksang	1,709	10.96%	10.08%
People's Democratic Alliance	Songchinkhup	1,508	9.67%	
NCP	Songlianlal	1,399	8.97%	−16.71%
CPI	Tuanzalian	1,152	7.39%	
LJP	N. Paochindou	1,067	6.85%	
RJD	N. Zatawn	610	3.91%	
INC	John K. Ngaihte	418	2.68%	−33.60%
Margin of victory		5,986	38.40%	30.82%
Turnout		15,588	80.71%	0.35%
Registered electors		19,313		15.36%
NPP gain from INC		Swing	13.08%	

=== Assembly Election 2002 ===
2002 Manipur Legislative Assembly election: Thanlon
Party	Candidate	Votes	%	±%
INC	Songchinkhup	4,825	36.28%	30.19%
SAP	John K. Ngaihte	3,817	28.70%	−6.05%
NCP	Chin-Gouthang	3,416	25.69%	
Independent	Kailal Suantak	1,123	8.44%	
BJP	Thangchinkham	117	0.88%	
Margin of victory		1,008	7.58%	−15.48%
Turnout		13,298	80.36%	−2.37%
Registered electors		16,741		0.73%
INC gain from MSCP		Swing	-9.68%	

=== Assembly Election 2000 ===
2000 Manipur Legislative Assembly election: Thanlon
Party	Candidate	Votes	%	±%
MSCP	Songchinkhup	8,864	57.81%	
SAP	C. Than	5,329	34.76%	
INC	John K. Ngaihte	935	6.10%	−27.27%
MPP	Thuamson	204	1.33%	−44.64%
Margin of victory		3,535	23.06%	10.46%
Turnout		15,332	92.88%	10.14%
Registered electors		16,620		6.10%
MSCP gain from MPP		Swing	11.85%	

=== Assembly Election 1995 ===
1995 Manipur Legislative Assembly election: Thanlon
Party	Candidate	Votes	%	±%
MPP	Songchinkhup	5,854	45.97%	
INC	T. Phungzathang	4,250	33.37%	−14.59%
Independent	C. Than	2,430	19.08%	
Margin of victory		1,604	12.60%	3.10%
Turnout		12,735	82.73%	−0.93%
Registered electors		15,665		−5.24%
MPP gain from INC		Swing	-2.00%	

=== Assembly Election 1990 ===
1990 Manipur Legislative Assembly election: Thanlon
Party	Candidate	Votes	%	±%
INC	T. Phungzathang	6,522	47.96%	5.58%
JD	Songchinkhup	5,231	38.47%	
Independent	Thangkhangin	1,687	12.41%	
Independent	B. K. Rose	110	0.81%	
Margin of victory		1,291	9.49%	−6.59%
Turnout		13,598	83.66%	0.71%
Registered electors		16,531		18.29%
INC hold		Swing	5.58%	

=== Assembly Election 1984 ===
1984 Manipur Legislative Assembly election: Thanlon
Party	Candidate	Votes	%	±%
INC	T. Phungzathang	4,801	42.38%	
Independent	N. Gouzagin	2,979	26.30%	
Independent	Thangkhangin	2,650	23.39%	
Independent	Sangkhum	785	6.93%	
Independent	Paudomang	113	1.00%	
Margin of victory		1,822	16.08%	−2.11%
Turnout		11,328	82.96%	3.26%
Registered electors		13,975		3.55%
INC gain from INC(I)		Swing	-7.50%	

=== Assembly Election 1980 ===
1980 Manipur Legislative Assembly election: Thanlon
Party	Candidate	Votes	%	±%
INC(I)	T. Phungzathang	5,264	49.88%	
Independent	Thangkhangin	3,344	31.69%	
INC(U)	T. Sangkhum	1,945	18.43%	
Margin of victory		1,920	18.19%	11.91%
Turnout		10,553	79.69%	1.76%
Registered electors		13,496		25.46%
INC(I) gain from Manipur Hills Union		Swing	-3.26%	

=== Assembly Election 1974 ===
1974 Manipur Legislative Assembly election: Thanlon
Party	Candidate	Votes	%	±%
Manipur Hills Union	N. Gouzagin	4,337	53.14%	
INC	Tunzakham	3,824	46.86%	23.68%
Margin of victory		513	6.29%	−19.44%
Turnout		8,161	77.93%	13.08%
Registered electors		10,757		31.39%
Manipur Hills Union gain from Independent		Swing	1.87%	

=== Assembly Election 1972 ===
1972 Manipur Legislative Assembly election: Thanlon
Party	Candidate	Votes	%	±%
Independent	N. Gouzagin	2,677	51.27%	
Independent	Nengkhosuan	1,334	25.55%	
INC	T. Kaigou	1,210	23.18%	−8.70%
Margin of victory		1,343	25.72%	20.36%
Turnout		5,221	64.85%	−6.02%
Registered electors		8,187		−57.34%
Independent gain from INC		Swing	19.40%	

=== Assembly Election 1967 ===
1967 Manipur Legislative Assembly election: Thanlon
Party	Candidate	Votes	%	±%
INC	Goukhenpao	4,198	31.87%	
Independent	Piangchinkhan	3,492	26.51%	
Independent	Thangkhupereng	2,650	20.12%	
Independent	Kamkhanthang	1,582	12.01%	
Independent	Vungkhom	987	7.49%	
Independent	Jaikunga	262	1.99%	
Margin of victory		706	5.36%	
Turnout		13,171	70.87%	
Registered electors		19,191		
INC win (new seat)				

== See also ==
- List of constituencies of the Manipur Legislative Assembly
- Churachandpur district
