= Holkhomang Haokip =

Indian politician (1939–2019)

- Born: 15 February 1939; Chassad, Kamjong District, Manipur
- Died: 8 April 2019 (aged 80); Imphal, Manipur, India
- Education: BA (Ramjas College, University of Delhi), MA (Allahabad University)
- Occupation: Social worker

Holkhomang Haokip (15 February 1939 – 8 April 2019) was an Indian politician, who became minister in various Manipur governments and a Member of Parliament during the 13th Lok Sabha.

Haokip was first elected as a member of the Manipur Legislative Assembly in 1972. He was a Member of Consultative Committee, Ministry of Home Affairs, Government of India from 2000–2004. The son of Indian National Army (INA) Freedom Fighter and pensioner Shri Chunglet Haokip, Holkhomang worked tirelessly for the upliftment of his people when he was the President of Kuki Inpi, the apex organisation of Kukis in Manipur, since 1995. He was the headmaster of Gandhi Memorial High School at Molnom, in Churachandpur, 1963–1972. Holkhomang was also the President of Kut Festival, a major festival of the Kuki people, for 8 years.

Haokip died on 8 April 2019, at the age of 80.

== History ==
- 1972–74: Member, Manipur Legislative Assembly
- 1972–73: Minister of State, Industries, Manipur
- 1974: Minister of State, Revenue, Manipur
- 1974–78: Minister of State, Works, Manipur Minister of State, Education and Tribal Welfare, Manipur
- 1979: Chairman, Public Accounts Committee, Manipur Legislative Assembly
- 1980: Deputy Chairman, State Planning Board, Manipur (with Cabinet Rank)
- 1980–84: Member, Manipur Legislative Assembly
- 1981–84: Cabinet Minister, Planning, Industries and Transport, Manipur
- 1985–89: General Secretary, Pradesh Congress Committee (I), Manipur
- 1989–92: Cabinet Minister, Industries, Manipur
- 1990–95: Member, Manipur Legislative Assembly
- 1992–95: Cabinet Minister, Power, Manipur
- 1999: Elected to 13th Lok Sabha
- 1999–2000: Member, Committee on Urban and Rural Development
- 2000–2004: Member, Consultative Committee, Ministry of Home Affairs
