= Moirangthem Nara =

Indian politician

Cabinet Minister for Arts and Culture and Sericulture, Manipur
- In office 2002–2004

Member of Legislative Assembly
- In office 1985–2007
- Constituency: 34 Wangjing Tentha AC

Personal details
- Born: 27 May 1949 (age 76) Tentha, Manipur
- Party: Communist Party of India
- Spouse: (L) M Binarani
- Children: Ellora Moirangthem & Ajanta Moirangthem
- As of 29 March, 2019

Dr. Moirangthem Nara Singh (born Tentha, 27 May 1949 (age 76) is an Indian politician from the state of Manipur. He is a former Cabinet Minister for Arts and Culture and Sericulture in Manipur serving from 2002 to 2004.

== Early life ==
Nara was born on 27 May 1949 in Tentha Village to M. Tona.

== Political career ==
He joined politics in 1973 for the first time and was elected as Member of the Legislative Assembly for the first time CPI in state Manipur.
