= Manipura (Mahabharata) =

Capital city mentioned in the Hindu epic Mahabharata

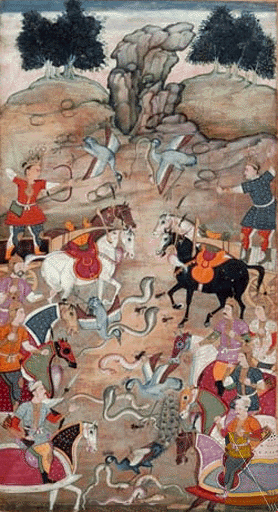
A folio from Razmnama depicting the battle between Babruvahana and Arjuna

Manipura (Sanskrit: मणिपुर, romanized: maṇipura, lit. 'city of jewels'), known as Manalura in the Southern and Critical Editions, is the capital city of a kingdom mentioned in the Hindu epic Mahabharata. According to the epic, it was located near a sea-shore, the Mahendra Mountains and the Kalinga Kingdom. Arjuna—one of the five Pandava brothers—visited Manipura and married Chitrangada, the princess of the region. They had a son named Babruvahana who later ruled it.

Manipur shares its name with a modern-day state of India, located in the North-Eastern part of the country. Some rulers of the state had claimed themselves to be the descendants of Arjuna. Some past scholars support the identification of the state with the city, others oppose this idea. However, the identification of the Manipura kingdom in the Mahabharata with the modern-day Indian state of Manipur is widely regarded by scholars as historically unsubstantiated. Geographic descriptions in the epic place the kingdom near coastal Kalinga, linguistically distinct from the Tibeto-Burman Meitei culture. Furthermore, genealogical and textual inconsistencies—combined with the absence of such traditions in early local chronicles—indicate that the connection is a product of later cultural reinterpretations, particularly during the Hinduization of Manipur in the 18th century. Based on the geographical description given in the epic, they state that Manipura kingdom was in present-day Odisha or Andhra Pradesh.

== Legend ==
In the Mahabharata, Arjuna was one of the Pandava brothers and they shared a common wife named Draupadi. To prevent jealousy among the brothers and identify the paternity of Draupadi's children, the Pandavas followed a condition in which if one brother was with Draupadi, others were forbidden to enter her chamber. If the condition was violated, the brother, who entered the room, had to go on a pilgrimage for 12 years. Once, when Yudhishthira—the eldest brother—was spending time with Draupadi, Arjuna entered the room to take his weapon.

As a result, Arjuna was exiled and he spent his time roaming around the subcontinent. During this period, he married a Naga lady named Ulupi, with whom he spent a night and continued his journey. He reached the kingdom of Manipur, which was then reigned by King Chitravahana. According to the Adi Parva of the epic, Arjuna reached Manipur after crossing the kingdom of Kalinga, the Mahendra Mountains and the sea-shore.

Chitravahana had only a daughter, Chitrangada, who was very beautiful and was trained as a warrior. Arjuna fell in love with her and asked her hand in marriage to her father. Chitravahana agreed but stated that the heir must inherit the throne of Manipur. After a son was born, Arjuna left the kingdom and continued his journey. His son was named Babruvahana and he became the king of Manipur after he reached maturity.

The next appearance of Manipur is in the Ashvamedhika Parva of the epic. After coming victorious in the Kurukshetra War, Yudhishthira performed Ashvamedha Yajna to expand his kingdom. A horse was loose free and the royal soldiers, led by Arjuna, followed it. When the horse reached Manipur, it was stopped was King Babruvahana. Arjuna and Babruvahana were not aware of each other's identity and a battle between them began. Chitrangada heard about it and rushed to stop it; however Babruvahana killed many warriors, including Arjuna. Ulupi, who was present there, revived Arjuna using a gem and revealed that Arjuna was killed because of the curse of celestial Vasus. Chitrangada told her husband about his son and all were happy to be reunited.

== Identification ==
South Asia circa 500 BCE, with location of Kalinga (Mahabharata).

The identification of the kingdom of Manipura mentioned in the Mahabharata with present-day Manipur in northeast India has been the subject of scholarly debate and regional controversy.

The state's name "Manipur" is itself a relatively recent addition, having replaced "Kangleipak" during the reign of King Pamheiba (1709–1757), also known as Garibniwaz. It was during his rule that Vaishnavism was introduced, resulting in widespread Sanskritization of names and practices. Names like Chitrangada and the adoption of surnames such as Singh and Devi were introduced during this time, aligning the local culture more closely with Hindu norms. This cultural reorientation has been linked by scholars to later attempts to connect Manipur with the Mahabharata. Further complicating the matter is the critical edition of the Mahabharata published by the Bhandarkar Oriental Research Institute. In the Adi Parvan, the kingdom of Chitravahana (Chitrangada’s father) is named Manalura. This has led scholars to locate the Manalur of the Adi Parvan in southern India and even to argue that there is no mention of Manipur in the Mahabharata. However, the Ashvamedhika Parvan of BORI CE refers to Babruvahana’s kingdom as Manipura, introducing an inconsistency that has fueled scholarly rejection of the present-day state's identification with the epic's locale.

Dr. Kangjia Gopal and R.K. Nimai have both argued that the Manipuri translation of the Mahabharata was altered to support the Arjuna-Chitrangada narrative. Place names in and around Imphal were reinterpreted to reinforce this connection. For instance, the locality Sagolmang was linked to Arjuna’s horse, based solely on the fact that "sagol" means horse. These reinterpretations, however, are widely considered to be deliberate cultural insertions rather than authentic historical accounts. In the eighteenth century, following the adoption of Hinduism by the ruling class, a theory began to emerge claiming that the Meiteis (community in Manipur) were of Aryan descent, which was promoted by Brahmins, royals, and scholars such as R.K. Jhalajit Singh, Iboongohal Singh, and Atombapu Sharma. Jhalajit Singh further asserted that Manipur had been connected to the rest of India culturally since 300 B.C., referencing Arjuna-Chitrangada episode. The identification of the kingdom and the modern state gained prominence after Manipur's controversial merger with India in 1949, being used to legitimize integration by embedding Manipur in the historical memory of Indian civilization. The popular retelling of Arjuna’s lineage served as a symbolic justification for the region’s inclusion within India's national and cultural boundaries.

Critics of the identification argue that it lacks historical, linguistic, and geographical credibility. Jotirmoy Roy's History of Manipur (1958) was one of the earliest modern rejections of the Aryan origin myth. His position was later echoed by many in academic and political circles. Scholars such as Gangmumei Kabui, J.H. Thumra, and R.C. Majumdar have contended that the claim of Aryan descent is a product of cultural imposition during and after Hinduization, designed to elevate the social standing of the ruling class within the Indian cultural framework. According to Kabui, these myths were introduced by Brahmins to flatter the newly converted kings and bear no grounding in historical fact. Linguistically, the Meitei language belongs to the Tibeto-Burman family, not Indo-Aryan, further undermining claims of Aryan origin. Additionally, Kabui and others note the complete absence of Arjuna or Babruvahana in royal genealogies originating from Nongda Lairen Pakhangba, the founder of Manipur’s historical monarchy. Despite this, attempts were made to fabricate a genealogical link between Arjuna and Nongda Lairen Pakhangba (f. 33 AD). The Vijay Panchali (also spelled Bijoy Panchali), a work by Hindu saint Shantidas Goswami, claimed Babruvahana as the father of King Nongda Lairen Pakhangba . The text also assigned him an Indo-Aryan name, “Yavistha,” in an effort to align him with Vedic traditions.

The geographical description of the kingdom in the Mahabharata also doesn't align with the landlocked hills of Manipur. Geographically, the Mahabharata describes the landmarks of the location of the Manipura or Manalura kingdom as situated near the Kalinga, the Mahendra Mountains (present day Eastern Ghats) and in the coastal area, again suggesting a coastal kingdom inconsistent with landlocked Manipur. Scholars such as Gait and Roy, quoting epic descriptions and relying on historical geography, have placed Manipura in southern Odisha or Southern India above Chennai, not northeast India.

In recent years, the narrative linking present-day Manipur to the Manipura of the Mahabharata has a highly sensitive topic. The identification is continued to be invoked in political discourse, often as a means of reinforcing cultural integration with the Indian mainstream. Statements by political leaders like Amit Shah and N Biren Singh have cited the Arjuna-Chitrangada episode to emphasize Manipur’s historical and civilizational ties to the rest of India. These remarks have drawn significant criticism from historians, scholars and regional political activists, arguing that such statements oversimplify complex historical realities and risk appropriating regional histories for ideological purposes. Jhalajit Singh's book was later banned from publishing or selling by students and the author's own family members, stating that it distorted Manipur’s history.

== Bibliography ==
- Buitenen, Johannes Adrianus Bernardus; Fitzgerald, James L. (1973). The Mahābhārata. University of Chicago Press. ISBN 978-0-226-84663-7.
- Mani, Vettam (1975). Puranic Encyclopaedia: A Comprehensive Dictionary With Special Reference to the Epic and Puranic Literature. Delhi: Motilal Banarsidass. ISBN 0-8426-0822-2.
- Roy, Jyotirmoy (1973). History of Manipur. Eastlight Book House.
- Devi, Lairenlakpam Bino (2002). The Lois of Manipur: Andro, Khurkhul, Phayeng and Sekmai. Mittal Publications. ISBN 978-81-7099-849-5.
