= Mahabharat Katha =

1997 Indian television series

- Directed by: Ravi Chopra
- Music by: Raj Kamal
- Country of origin: India
- Original language: Hindi
- No. of seasons: 1
- No. of episodes: 45

Production
- Producer: B. R. Chopra
- Running time: 40-45 minutes
- Production company: B R Films

Original release
- Network: DD National
- Release: 1997 – 1998

Related
- Mahabharat (1988); Vishnu Puran

Mahabharat Katha is an Indian television series aired on DD National. This is a sequel which contains portions and stories left out of Mahabharat. It was produced by B. R. Chopra and directed by his son Ravi Chopra.

== Plot ==
This series covers events not included in the original show including the life of Hidimba, Ghatotkatch, Maurvi, Barbareek, aftermath of war, Arjuna's marriages with Ulupi and Chitrāngadā, Babhruvahana, Karna's marriage with Padmavati and his son, Vrishketu and mourning after the war.

The series also showcases the story's Ashwamedha yagna, during which Arjuna's son Babruvahana, prince of Manipur fights Arjuna and Vrishketu when the horse of yagna reaches Manipur. In the fight, Arjuna and Vrishketu are killed. However, Krishna revives both of them and everyone lives happily ever after.

== Cast ==
- Harish Bhimani as Samay
- Rishabh Shukla as Krishna
- Sagar Salunkhe as Balarama
- Arjun as Arjuna
- Bijay Anand as Babruvahana
- Gajendra Chauhan as Yudhisthira
- Praveen Kumar as Bhima
- Roopa Ganguly as Draupadi
- Puneet Issar as Duryodhana
- Durga Jasraj as Ulupi
- Mukesh Khanna as Bhishma
- Kartika Rane as Satyabhama
- Bhakti Narula as Kunti
- Veena Rao as Dushala
- Sonu Walia as Chitrāngadā
- Arun Bali as Chitravahan
- Surendra Pal as Dronacharya
- Rajesh Vivek as Vyasa
- Manoj Verma as Kamadeva
- Prajakta as Rati
- Kiran Juneja as Ganga
- Virendra Razdan as Vidura
- Manish Khanna as Viprachitti
- Ayub Khan as Parikshit
- Aman Verma as Vrishketu
- Adi Irani as Chandak
- Nimai Bali as Anushalva
- Deepak Jethi as Barbarik
- Jitendra Trehan as Suryadev
- Sudesh Berry as Indradev
- Suhas Khandke as Nagraj
- Shashi Sharma as Nagrani
- Deepak Qazir as Anushalva's Mama

== Episodes ==
- Episode 1 – Barbareek goes to meet the Pandavas. Everyone gets tensed by his power of three arrows.
- Episode 2 – Shakuni convinces Duryodhana to kill unarmed Barbareek.
- Episode 3 – Draupadi goes to Krishna to find a solution for Barbareek. Krishna narrates the story of Barbareek.
- Episode 4 – Krishna kills Narakasur and rescues sixteen thousand queens.
- Episode 5 – Ghatotkach goes to marry Mourvi Barbareek is born.
- Episode 6 – Barbareek goes to Krishna as a disciple.
- Episode 7 – Krishna sends Barbareek to be a disciple of Guru Vijay Siddha Sen.
- Episode 8 – Barbareek performs severe penance to please Kamakhya Devi and gets three powerful arrows. Bheem and Barbareek meet.
- Episode 9 – Barbareek meets Bheesma Pitamah. Krishna tests Barbareek's arrows. Barbareek gives his head as guru Dakshina to Krishna.
- Episode 10 – Barbareek's head is kept on a mountain to witness the Kurukshetra war. War begins.
- Episode 11 – Ashwathama kills the sons of Pandavas and takes their heads to Duryodhana.
- Episode 12 – War ends. Barbareek's head is joined to his body and he leaves for sanyas.
- Episode 13 – Everyone laments loss due to war. Arjun begs for forgiveness from Ganga but she refuses to forgive.
- Episode 14 – Yudhisthir dreams of being reprimanded by Bheesma, Drona, and Karna.
- Episode 15 – Yudhisthir gets ready to take sanyas. Krishna convinces him of Raja dharma and he stays back to be the king and serve Hastinapur.
- Episode 16 – Story of Karna marrying Padmavati.
- Episode 17 – Kunti takes Padmavati and her son Vrishaketu to Hastinapur.
- Episode 18 – Meghavarna (Barbareek's brother) and Vrishaketu together set out to bring shyamkarn horse and fight with the armies of Bhadravati king Yuvanashva.
- Episode 19 – Meghavarna and Vrishaketu bring the shyamkarn horse. Padmavati kidnapped by Anushalva from Ashwamedha yajna.
- Episode 20 – Arjun goes to free Padmavati but is himself caught. Krishna goes for their rescue.
- Episode 21 – Krisna shows his Virat roop and kills Upadrav. Ashwamedha yajna begins.
- Episode 22 – Reconciliation between Dushala and Arjun.
- Episode 23 – Ashwamedha horse reaches the Madra Kingdom. Shakuni's son Viprachitti and Madra king Arun play a Dice Game.
- Episode 24 – Viprachitti captures Ashwamedha's horse. On Gandhari's and his mother Charulata's insistence, he mends his relation with Bheem.
- Episode 25 – Viprachitti throws away the dice of his father Shakuni and promises never to indulge in gambling again.
- Episode 26 – Ashwamedha horse moves next to Saurashtra. Balaram accepts Arjun's peace proposal on Krisha's request.
- Episode 27 – Ashwamedha reaches Manipura. Babruvahan gets a boon from Kamakhya Devi. Flashback of Babruvahan's story begins.
- Episode 28 – Arjun visits Naglok and meets Ulupi. Ulupi sets out to kill Arjuna.
- Episode 29 – Ulupi kidnaps Arjun and takes him to Naglok.
- Episode 30 – Love blossoms between Ulupi and Arjuna
- Episode 31 – Nagraj accepts Arjun's peace proposal.
- Episode 32 – Arjun stays for an extra day for amavasya and swayamvar in Naglok
- Episode 33 – Arjun marries Ulupi. Fight between Chitrangada and Arjun.
- Episode 34 – Chitrangada invokes Kamadev and gets her blessing to regain her forgotten woman traits. Manipur king accepts Arjun's peace proposal.
- Episode 35 – Ulupi gives birth to Iravan. Arjun saves Chitrangada from drowning.
- Episode 36 – Krishna convinces Arjun to marry Chitrangada and the marriage takes place.
- Episode 37 – Chandak swears to take revenge against Arjun. He goes to Manipur to invite Arjun for Ulupi's son Iravan's birthday.
- Episode 38 – Ulupi and Chandak trick Arjuna to believe Chitrangada is having extramarital affair.
- Episode 39 – Arjun doubts Chitrangada of infidelity and abandons her. Chitrangada gives birth to Babruvahan.
- Episode 40 – Arjun meets Krishna in Dwarka and realizes his injustice towards Chitrangada. Ulupi realizes her mistake. Babruvahan is grown up and swears to defeat Arjun. Flashback of Babruvahan's story ends (which had begun in episode 27).
- Episode 41 – Vrishaketu leaves for Manipur. Bheem goes to capture Babruvahan.
- Episode 42 – Babruvahan defeats Bheem and kills Vrishaketu.
- Episode 43 – Babruvahan kills Arjun.
- Episode 44 – Babruvahan and Chitrangada leave for Naglok to bring nagmani for saving Arjun.
- Episode 45 – Arjun and Vrishaketu are brought back to life by Krishna.

== Production ==
The cast and crew were the same as the original series, except some actors like Nitish Bharadwaj who played Krishna in the original series was replaced by Rishabh Shukla (who had played the role of Shantanu in the original series) and Nazneen who played Kunti in the original series was replaced by Bhakti Narula.

The 45-episode Hindi series ran on DD National.

== Home media ==
In 2019, Pen India Ltd bought the rights of the show and uploaded all the episodes on its devotional YouTube channel Pen Bhakti including the original series Mahabharat (1988 TV series).
