= Babruvahana (1977 film) =

1977 Indian Kannada film

- Theatrical release poster
- Directed by: Hunsur Krishnamurthy
- Screenplay by: Hunsur Krishnamurthy
- Produced by: K. C. N. Chandrashekhar
- Starring: Rajkumar; B. Saroja Devi; Kanchana; Jayamala
- Cinematography: Srikanth
- Edited by: P. Bhaktavatsalam
- Music by: T. G. Lingappa
- Production company: Rajkamal Arts
- Distributed by: Rajkamal Arts
- Release date: 16 February 1977
- Running time: 160 minutes
- Country: India
- Language: Kannada

Babruvahana is a 1977 Indian Kannada-language Hindu mythological film directed by Hunsur Krishnamurthy . The film stars Rajkumar in a dual role as Arjuna and his son Babruvahana, the titular character alongside an ensemble supporting cast that includes B. Saroja Devi, Kanchana, Jayamala, Vajramuni, Thoogudeepa Srinivas and Ramakrishna.

The film narrates the story of Babruvahana, the son of Arjuna and Chitrangada, and the events that lead to him waging a war against his own father so as to restore his mother's honour. This was the first Kannada movie and seventh Indian movie to be based on Babruvahana.

The film won two awards at the 1976–77 Karnataka State Film Awards — Best Actor (Rajkumar) and Best Sound Recording (S. P. Ramanathan). The movie saw a theatrical run of 25 weeks. The movie was dubbed in Telugu in 1979 as Arjuna Garvabhangam. It was also dubbed in Hindi as Veer Arjun in 1977. This was the second instance of him portraying the role of Arjuna's son - the first when he portrayed the role of Iravan in the 1961 movie Nagarjuna. With this, he became the only Indian actor to portray the role of Arjuna and his two sons.

== Plot ==
The story starts at Indraprasta where the Pandavas are ruling after the partition of Hastinapura. On one occasion Arjuna accidentally breaches the privacy of his elder brother Yudhistira and Draupadi when they are together. To repent for this he decides to go on an exile. While in the Manipura kingdom he impresses the princess Chitrangada by hunting a tiger by Shabdavedhi (non-visual archery). The princess falls for Arjuna and accepts him as her husband.

While bathing in the river Arjuna is abducted by Uluchi, the princess of Nagaloka. She admits her feelings for Arjuna and they marry in Gandharva vivaha. Krishna uses his magical powers to bring Arjuna back from Nagaloka. He meets up with Chitrangada and they marry in Gandharva vivaha giving birth to a son, Babruvahana.

Krishna, with the help of Ghatotkacha brings back Arjuna from Manipura and wipes his memory of both the wives - Chitrangada and Uluchi. He says his sister, Subhadra is eligible for marriage and Balarama wishes Duryodhana to be married to her. With the help of Krishna, Arjuna disguises himself as a sanyasi and elopes with Subhadra.

Years pass by and the Pandavas are victorious in the Mahabharata war. They organise the Ashwamedha yaga to establish sovereignty over the subcontinent. Arjuna spearheads the campaign along with Karna's son, Vrishaketu and conquers kingdom after kingdom. The scorned queen of one of the defeated kings vows revenge on Arjuna and forces Ganga to curse Arjuna for killing the latter's son Bhishma. Ganga curses Arjuna that he will die at the hands of his own son.

Babruvahana has grown up to become the ruler of Manipura kingdom and surpasses his father Arjuna in archery. Pandavas' Ashwamedha horse enters the kingdom of Manipura. Babruvahana must either accept sovereignty of Pandavas over the region and pay a tribute or defeat Arjuna in battle. Upon learning from his mother that Arjuna is his biological father, Babruvahana goes to Pandavas' camp to offer his submission and to accept Arjuna as his father. Arjuna, who cannot remember Chitrangada insults Babruvahana by calling his mother a woman of loose morals.

Thus the battleground is set for a clash between the forces of Arjuna and Babruvahana. On the first and second days of the battle Babruvahana holds off Arjuna's forces with ease and kills Vrishaketu. On the third day, Arjuna and Babruvahana meet face to face on the battlefield. Chitrangada serves as charioteer of Arjuna whereas Uluchi becomes charioteer of Babruvahana. Babruvahana kills Arjuna and effectively ends their Ashwamedha Yaga. Uluchi reveals herself to be Ganga in disguise who was there to witness her curse reap fruits. Uluchi advises Babruvahana to revive Arjuna using Sanjeevani-mani from Nagaloka.

As Chitrangada is lamenting over Arjuna's death, Takshak decapitates Arjuna's corpse and take his head to Nagaloka. Krishna with the help of his Sudharshan Chakra defeats Takshak's henchmen and brings back the severed head of Arjuna. Using the Sanjeevani-mani which Babruvahana got from Nagaloka, Arjuna is revived. Lord Krishna then revives all the soldiers who died in the battle. Arjuna unites with his wife Chitrangada and accepts Babruvahana as his son.

== Cast ==
Actor	Character(s)	
Rajkumar	Arjuna and Babruvahana (dual characters of father and son)	Arjuna: An ace archer and the third of the Pandava brothers. He met Chitrangada during his exile and married her which did not last long due to an evil plot by his wife Uloopi. He is the father of Babruvahana. Babruvahana: The son of Arjuna and Chitrangada. Babruvahana succeeded his maternal grandfather as the ruler of Manipur. He later goes to visit his father only to be insulted and taunted by the former, causing him to wage a war against his father and eventually kill him.
B. Saroja Devi	Chitrāngadā	The daughter of the King of Manipur, she is one of Arjuna's consorts and the mother of Babruvahana. She meets Arjuna during his exile.
Kanchana	Uloopi (voice dubbed by B. Jayashree)	The daughter of Kauravya, the King of Nagas, she is the second wife of Arjuna, who separated him from Chitrangada.
Jayamala	Subhadra	The younger sister of Lord Krishna and wife of Arjuna.
Ramakrishna	Krishna	Elder brother of Subhadra and Arjuna's friendly charioteer.
Vajramuni	Vrishaketu	The youngest son of Karna, Arjuna has a great affection for him.
Thoogudeepa Srinivas	Takshaka	King of Nagas who was driven away from along with his race from their homeland by Arjuna.
Shakti Prasad		
Shani Mahadevappa		
Sampath	Kauravya	Uloopi's father and the King of Nagas
Bhatti Mahadevappa		
Rajanand		

== Production ==
The war scenes were shot at Red Hills near Chennai.

== Soundtrack ==
The music of the film was composed by T. G. Lingappa with lyrics for the soundtrack penned by Chi. Udaya Shankar and Hunsur Krishnamurthy.

Babruvahana

Soundtrack album by T. G. Lingappa
- Released: 1976
- Recorded: 1976
- Genre: Feature film soundtrack
- Length: 28:45
- Language: Kannada
- Label: Saregama

=== Track list ===
S.No	Title	Singer(s)	Lyrics
1	"Ninna Kanna Notadalle"	P. B. Sreenivas	Chi. Udayashankar
2	"Ee Samaya Anandamaya"	Rajkumar, S. Janaki	Chi. Udayashankar
3	"Aaraadhisuve Madanaari"	Rajkumar	Hunsur Krishnamurthy
4	"Barasidilu Badidanathe"	Rajkumar	Chi. Udayashankar
5	"Yaaru Thiliyaru Ninna Bhujabalada"	P. B. Sreenivas, Rajkumar	Hunsur Krishnamurthy

== Release ==
The film received a U Certificate from the Censor Board's regional office at Chennai, the certificate dated 17 January 1977. The film was released on 16 February 1977 to positive reviews.

== Box office ==
The film had a phenomenal run of 175 days in several centres across Karnataka. The film had a 100 days run in Chennai while the Telugu dubbed version also completed a 100 days run in Andhra Pradesh.

== Awards ==
1976–77 Karnataka State Film Awards

- Best Actor — Rajkumar
- Best Sound Recording — S. P. Ramanathan
