= Chitrangada: The Crowning Wish =

2012 Indian Bengali-language film

- Theatrical poster of the film.
- Directed by: Rituparno Ghosh
- Written by: Rituparno Ghosh
- Produced by: Shree Venkatesh Films
- Starring: Rituparno Ghosh; Jisshu Sengupta
- Cinematography: Abhik Mukhopadhyay
- Edited by: Arghyakamal Mitra
- Music by: Debojyoti Mishra
- Release dates: 25 May 2012 (New York Indian Film Festival); 31 August 2012 (India)
- Running time: 135 minutes
- Country: India
- Language: Bengali

Chitrangada: The Crowning Wish is a 2012 Bengali-language film written and directed by Rituparno Ghosh. The film premiered on 25 May 2012 at the New York Indian Film Festival. The film tells the story of a choreographer who is struggling with his gender identity. It is loosely based on Rabindranath Tagore's play Chitra; which is Tagore's take on the story of Chitrāngadā, a character from the Mahābhārata.

== Plot ==
Rudra Chatterjee (Rituparno Ghosh) has spent his life going against social convention. As a young man he defied his father's wishes, and became a choreographer instead of an engineer. As he prepares with his team to stage Tagore's Chitrangada, he meets Partho (Jisshu Sengupta) who is a drug-addict percussionist introduced to the team by the main dancer Kasturi (Raima Sen). Soon, Rudra develops chemistry with Partho and they fall deep into a passionate love affair. During the course of their relationship, they decide to adopt a child. But there is one problem: same-sex couples are not permitted to adopt children. So Rudra decides to go through a gender change treatment to embrace the womanhood he longs for. But will this surgery change his life and fulfill all his long-cherished dreams? The story ends with the line "Be What You Wish To Be".

== Cast ==
- Rituparno Ghosh as Rudra "Khokon" Chatterjee
- Jisshu Sengupta as Partho, the percussionist
- Anjan Dutt as Subho
- Anashua Majumdar as Rudra's mother
- Deepankar De as Rudra's father
- Raima Sen as Kasturi in a guest appearance
- Aparajita Auddy as Mala in a guest appearance
- Kaushik Banerjee as Manish
- Sanjoy Nag (cameo appearance) as Rahul (Rudra's ex-boyfriend)

== Awards ==
Special Jury Award at the 60th National Film Awards
