= Longjam =

Longjam is a Meitei surname. Notable people with the surname include:

- Longjam Thambou Singh, Indian politician
- Ronald Longjam (born 1997), Indian cricketer
