= Shantidas Gosai =

Hindu preacher

Shantidas Gosai or Shantidas Goswami, also known as Shantidas Adhikari, was a Hindu preacher from Sylhet, Bengal.

He composed the Vijay Panchali (also spelt Bijoy Panchali in Bengali), in which he projected the land of Manipur in northeast India as the Manipur of the Mahabharata His work identified Nongda Lairen Pakhangba as "Yavistha". He influenced the Manipuri King Garib Niwaz, who adopted and implemented Hinduism as the state religion of the Manipur Kingdom. The king subsequently renamed his kingdom from Kangleipak (its native name) to Manipur, and banned the Meitei script.

== See also ==
- Rajkumar Jhalajit Singh
