= Khekman Assembly constituency =

Constituency of the Manipur legislative assembly in India

Khekman
- Former constituency No. 32 for the Manipur Legislative Assembly

Constituency details
- Country: India
- Region: Northeast India
- State: Manipur
- Established: 1972
- Abolished: 1974
- Total electors: 9,490 (1972)
- Reservation: None

Khekman was an assembly constituency in the Indian state of Manipur.

== Members of the Legislative Assembly ==
Election	Member	Party
1972	Habibur Ramam	Indian National Congress

== Election results ==
=== 1972 Assembly election ===
1972 Manipur Legislative Assembly election: Khekman
Party	Candidate	Votes	%	±%
INC	Habibur Ramam	3,790	44.10%	New
MPP	Thoudam Krishna Singh	3,779	43.97%	New
Independent	Thongam Koireng	888	10.33%	New
Margin of victory		11	0.13%	
Turnout		8,594	90.56%	
Registered electors		9,490		
INC win (new seat)				
