= Khergao Assembly constituency =

Constituency of the Manipur legislative assembly in India

Khergao
- Former constituency for the Manipur Legislative Assembly

Constituency details
- Country: India
- Region: Northeast India
- State: Manipur
- Established: 1972
- Abolished: 1974
- Total electors: 10,575 (1972)
- Reservation: None

Khergao was an assembly constituency in the Indian state of Manipur.

== Members of the Legislative Assembly ==
Election	Member	Party
1972	Wangkhem Ibhol Singh	Indian National Congress

== Election results ==
=== 1972 Assembly election ===
1972 Manipur Legislative Assembly election: Khergao
Party	Candidate	Votes	%	±%
INC	Wangkhem Ibhol Singh	2,561	29.03%	New
MPP	Abdul Wahid	2,003	22.70%	New
CPI	Longjam Jnanendra	1,723	19.53%	New
Independent	Abdul Haque	1,501	17.01%	New
Socialist Party (India)	Muhibullah	697	7.90%	New
Independent	Mohammad Abdul Bari	190	2.15%	New
Margin of victory		558	6.33%	
Turnout		8,822	83.42%	
Registered electors		10,575		
INC win (new seat)				
