= 1967 Manipur Legislative Assembly election =

Legislative Assembly election in Manipur, India

- 21 February 1967

All 30 seats in the Manipur Legislative Assembly 16 seats needed for a majority
- Registered: 468,707
- Turnout: 69.10%

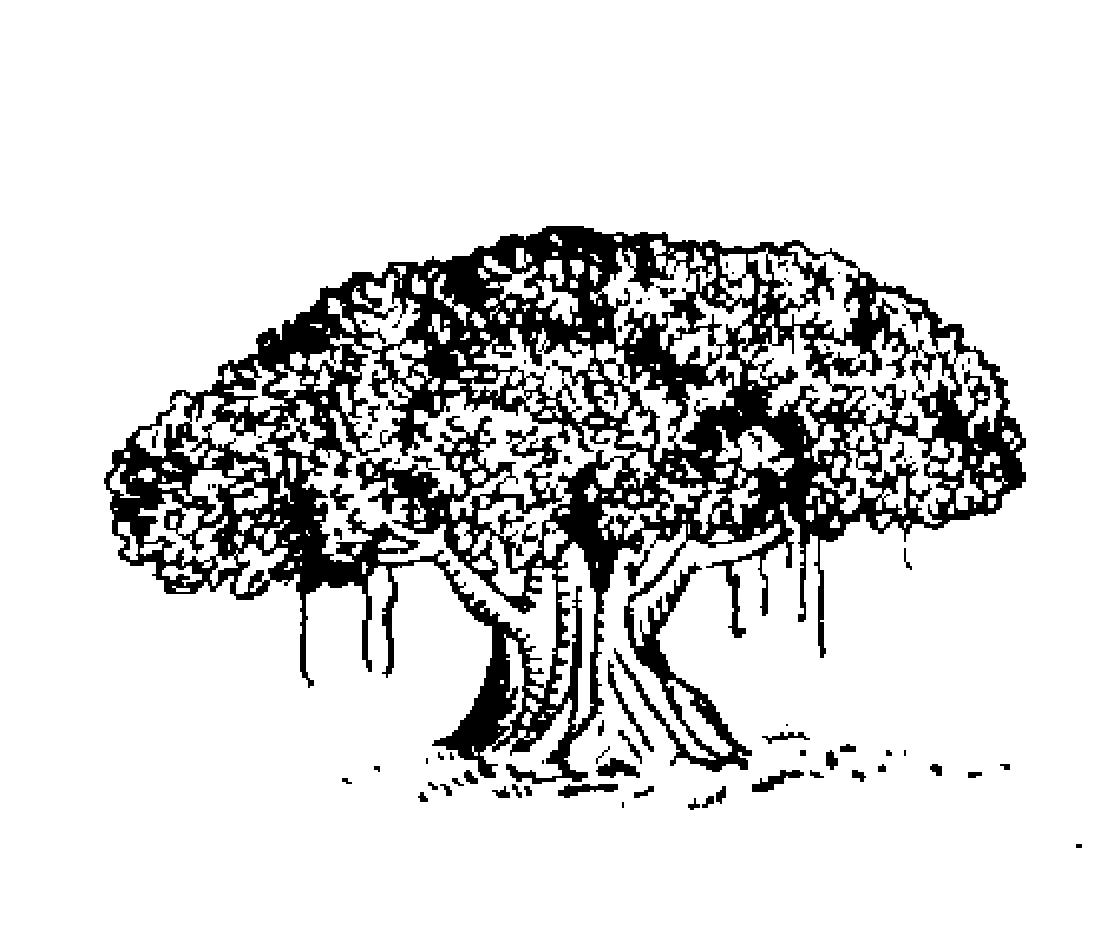
	Majority party	Minority party
Leader	Mairembam Koireng Singh
Party	INC	SSP
Leader's seat	Thanga
Seats before	–	–
Seats won	16	4
Popular vote	32.53%	11.70%
CM before election
Office established
Elected CM
Mairembam Koireng Singh
INC

Elections to the Manipur Legislative Assembly were held in February 1967 to elect members of the 30 constituencies in Manipur, India. The Indian National Congress won the most seats and its leader, Mairembam Koireng Singh was appointed as the Chief Minister of Manipur for his second term.

== Background ==
After the passing of the States Reorganisation Act, 1956 and the Constitution (Seventh Amendment) Act, 1956, Manipur was converted from a Part-C state to a Union Territory but, it wasn't assigned a Legislative Assembly. Later, after the passing of The Government of Union Territories Act, 1963, Manipur was assigned a Legislative Assembly of 30 members. A delimitation commission was set up which included the members of the Lok Sabha who were representing Manipur at the time.

== Result ==
Party	Votes	%	Seats
Indian National Congress	101,504	32.53	16
Samyukta Socialist Party	36,520	11.70	4
Communist Party of India	17,062	5.47	1
Praja Socialist Party	2,417	0.77	0
Communist Party of India (Marxist)	2,093	0.67	0
Independents	152,419	48.85	9
Total	312,015	100.00	30
Valid votes	312,015	82.00	
Invalid/blank votes	68,505	18.00	
Total votes	380,520	100.00	
Registered voters/turnout	468,707	81.19	
Source: ECI

=== Results by constituency ===
Winner, runner-up, voter turnout, and victory margin in every constituency
Assembly Constituency		Turnout	Winner				Runner Up				Margin
#k	Names	%	Candidate	Party	Votes	%	Candidate	Party	Votes	%	Margin
1	Sagolmang	73.31%	M. Ibohal	CPI	3,856	35.24%	T. B. Singh	INC	2,268	20.73%	1,588
2	Khurai	78.87%	K. Bathakur Sharma	SSP	4,482	35.77%	R. U. Singh	INC	3,724	29.72%	758
3	Wangkhei	75.63%	L. A. Singh	SSP	5,110	39.06%	W. I. Singh	INC	4,881	37.31%	229
4	Thongju	83.35%	S. A. Singh	INC	4,465	34.70%	H. S. Singh	SSP	4,251	33.04%	214
5	Top Chingtha	74.58%	A. Ali	Independent	3,726	26.02%	P. P. Singh	CPI	2,783	19.43%	943
6	Mayang Imphal	85.67%	C. Rajmohon	Independent	4,253	31.95%	K. Gulamjat	Independent	3,438	25.82%	815
7	Singjamei	76.10%	A. Biramangol	Independent	3,389	23.92%	I. Tompok	Independent	3,087	21.79%	302
8	Sagolband	79.49%	S. Gambhir	INC	6,595	51.20%	N. Ibomcha	Independent	6,088	47.27%	507
9	Keishamthong	79.25%	L. Thambou	INC	4,488	32.62%	L. Manaobi	Independent	4,305	31.29%	183
10	Uripok	63.46%	N. Tombi	INC	5,841	51.42%	R. K. Upendra	SSP	2,546	22.41%	3,295
11	Konthoujam	81.16%	S. Tombi	INC	4,522	38.07%	A. Kullachandra	Independent	4,297	36.17%	225
12	Sekmai	78.19%	K. Chaoba	INC	4,206	40.91%	K. Jugeshwro	CPI	2,586	25.15%	1,620
13	Nambol	82.14%	Y. Yaima	Independent	6,084	44.18%	S. Sharma	INC	3,753	27.25%	2,331
14	Bishnupur	75.03%	L. Ibomcha	INC	5,784	44.45%	A. Ketuki	SSP	3,327	25.57%	2,457
15	Thanga	76.90%	Mairembam Koireng Singh	INC	5,823	44.66%	H. Kangjamba	SSP	4,571	35.06%	1,252
16	Lilong	85.54%	Mohammed Alimuddin	INC	5,199	38.02%	H. Rahaman	Independent	4,984	36.45%	215
17	Thoubal	83.51%	W. Mani	INC	2,943	21.86%	L. Chaoyaima	Independent	2,546	18.91%	397
18	Khangabok	77.13%	M. Chaoba	INC	4,380	33.71%	T. Achouba	Independent	4,060	31.25%	320
19	Kakching	80.42%	Y. Nimai	SSP	5,095	35.41%	M. Ibotombi	INC	3,491	24.26%	1,604
20	Hiyanglam	73.20%	T. Anoubi	SSP	3,120	23.08%	N. Kanhai	INC	2,703	20.00%	417
21	Tengnoupal	48.70%	Paokhohang	Independent	2,603	29.83%	K. Leithil	Independent	2,399	27.50%	204
22	Phungyar	48.15%	K. Envey	INC	3,247	63.53%	H. L. Kim	Independent	850	16.63%	2,397
23	Ukhrul	33.14%	L. Solomon	INC	2,995	81.06%	P. Mingthing	Independent	447	12.10%	2,548
24	Mao East	11.36%	Shoukhothang	Independent	848	51.68%	S. Larbo	Independent	732	44.61%	116
25	Mao West	0.00%	S. Larho	INC	(UNCONTESTED)						
26	Tamei	29.86%	D. Kipgen	Independent	1,621	43.66%	H. Ngailert	Independent	1,297	34.93%	324
27	Tamenglong	8.52%	Kakhangai	Independent	622	47.88%	A. M. Tundas	INC	396	30.48%	226
28	Jiribam	73.91%	S. B. Singh	INC	4,536	36.18%	S. Hrangchal	Independent	2,301	18.35%	2,235
29	Thanlon	70.87%	Goukhenpao	INC	4,198	30.87%	Piangchinkhan	Independent	3,492	25.68%	706
30	Churachandpur	78.49%	Lalroukung	Independent	3,558	24.88%	Semkhupau	Independent	2,654	18.56%	904

== See also ==
- List of constituencies of the Manipur Legislative Assembly
- 1967 elections in India
