= Longjam Thambou Singh =

Longjam Thambou Singh was an Indian politician from the state of Manipur. He was associated with Indian National Congress. In the 1967 state elections, he was elected to the Manipur Legislative Assembly from the Keishamthong constituency, securing 4,488 (33.54%) votes. For 12 days, (from 13 to 24 October 1967) he served as the Chief Minister of Manipur.

In the 1967 elections, the Congress had won 16 out of 30 seats. But with the support of 7 independent leaders Mairembam Koireng Singh became the Chief Minister again in March 1967. In October 1967, 9 leaders left the Congress and Meirembam's government ended. Longjam Thambou Singh formed the first coalition government in the state under the name "Manipur United Front". But immediately a politician from this coalition left his group and joined the Congress, followed by the Speaker and Deputy Speaker of Manipur Legislative Assembly resigning. Unable to elect a new Speaker and Deputy Speaker, Singh's government was dismissed and President's rule was imposed in Manipur.
