= Mayang Imphal Assembly constituency =

Legislative Assembly constituency in Manipur State, India

Coordinates: 24.60°N 93.87°E

Mayang Imphal
- Constituency No. 23 for the Manipur Legislative Assembly

Constituency details
- Country: India
- Region: Northeast India
- State: Manipur
- District: Imphal West
- Lok Sabha constituency: Inner Manipur
- Established: 1967
- Total electors: 32,053
- Reservation: None

Member of Legislative Assembly
- 12th Manipur Legislative Assembly
- Incumbent Kongkham Robindro Singh
- Party: Bharatiya Janata Party
- Elected year: 2017

Mayang Imphal (Vidhan Sabha constituency) is one of the 60 constituencies in the Manipur Legislative Assembly of Manipur, a north-eastern state of India. Mayang Imphal is also part of Inner Manipur Lok Sabha constituency.

== Extent ==
Mayang Imphal is the 23rd among 60 constituencies of Manipur. It consists of 41 parts namely: 1 - Samushang Shantipur, 2 - Kokchai, 3 - Mutum Yangbi, 4 - Mayang Imphal Konchak Awang Leikai, 5 - Mayang Imphal Konchak Makha Leikai, 6 - Mayang Imphal Konchak Mayai Leikai, 7 - Mayang Imphal Konchak (A), 8 - Mayang Imphal Konchak (B), 9 - Mayang Imphal Thana Awang Leikai Sorok Maning, 10 - Mayang Imphal Thana Sorok Mamang and Bazar Mamang, 11 - Mayang Imphal Thana Mamang (A), 12 - Mayang Imphal Thana Mamang (B), 13 - Chirai, 14 - Mayang Imphal Thana Khunou I.B. Awang, 15 - Mayang Imphal Thana Khunou I.B. Makha, 16 - Chabung Company, 17 - Chabung Company Makha Leikai, 18 - Mayang Imphal Wangkhei Leikai (A), 19 - Mayang Imphal Wangkhei Leikai (B), 20 - Bengoon, 21 - Bengoon Loukok Leikai, 22 - Bengoon Yangbi Leikai, 23 - Bengoon Awang Leikai, 24 - Bengoon Maning & Makha Leikai, 25 - Bengoon Mayai Leikai, 26 - Uchiwa Wangbal, 27 - Uchiwa Awang Leikai, 28 - Uchiwa Mayai Leikai (A), 29 - Uchiwa Mayai Leikai (B), 30 - Hangoon, 31 - Heiyel, 32 - Thongam, 33 - Phoubakchao Awang Leikai, 34 - Phoubakchao Makha Leikai, 35 - Komlakhong Makha Leikai (A), 36 - Komlakhong Makha Leikai (B), 37 - Laphupat Tera Khunou (A), 38 - Laphupat Tera Awang Leikai, 39 - Laphupat Tera, 40 - Laphupat Tera Khunou (B), and 41 - Khordak.

== Members of Legislative Assembly ==
Election	Member	Party
1967	C. Rajmohon	Independent politician
1972	Abdul Latip	Independent politician
1974	Abdul Latip	Manipur People's Party
1980	Khumujam Amutombi Singh	Indian National Congress
1984	Meinam Nilachandra Singh	Janata Party
1990	Khumujam Amutombi Singh	Janata Dal
1995	Meinam Nilachandra Singh	Indian National Congress
2000	Khumujam Amutombi Singh	Indian National Congress
2002	Meinam Nilchandra Singh	Federal Party of Manipur
2007	Dr. Khumujam Ratan Kumar Singh	Indian National Congress
2012	Dr. Khumujam Ratan Kumar Singh	Indian National Congress
2017	Kongkham Robindro Singh	Bharatiya Janata Party
2022	Kongkham Robindro Singh	Bharatiya Janata Party

== Election results ==
Vote share of winning candidates
2022	47.73%
2017	55.40%
2012	43.90%
2007	37.99%
2002	30.75%
2000	27.55%
1995	32.13%
1990	40.95%
1984	36.15%
1980	36.51%
1974	36.44%
1972	29.15%
1967	33.17%

=== 2027 Assembly election ===
2027 Manipur Legislative Assembly election: Mayang Imphal
Party	Candidate	Votes	%	±%
INC				
NDA				
NOTA	None of the above			
Majority				
Turnout				
gain from		Swing		

=== Assembly Election 2022 ===
2022 Manipur Legislative Assembly election: Mayang Imphal
Party	Candidate	Votes	%	±%
BJP	Kongkham Robindro Singh	14,642	47.73%	−7.68%
INC	Dr. Khumujam Ratankumar Singh	8,513	27.75%	−16.39%
NPP	Urikhimbam Ramesh Singh	7,374	24.04%	
Margin of victory		6,129	19.98%	8.72%
Turnout		30,679	95.71%	0.76%
Registered electors		32,053		10.79%
BJP hold		Swing	-7.68%	

=== Assembly Election 2017 ===
2017 Manipur Legislative Assembly election: Mayang Imphal
Party	Candidate	Votes	%	±%
BJP	Kongkham Robindro Singh	15,221	55.40%	49.93%
INC	Dr. Khumujam Ratankumar Singh	12,127	44.14%	0.24%
Margin of victory		3,094	11.26%	7.91%
Turnout		27,473	94.96%	2.74%
Registered electors		28,932		13.13%
BJP gain from INC		Swing	11.51%	

=== Assembly Election 2012 ===
2012 Manipur Legislative Assembly election: Mayang Imphal
Party	Candidate	Votes	%	±%
INC	Khumujam Ratankumar Singh	10,353	43.90%	5.91%
AITC	Kongkham Manglem Singh	9,562	40.54%	
MSCP	Meinam Khagemba	2,377	10.08%	
BJP	Bogimayum Moulana Abdus Salam	1,292	5.48%	
Margin of victory		791	3.35%	−1.21%
Turnout		23,584	92.22%	−0.81%
Registered electors		25,575		9.36%
INC hold		Swing	5.91%	

=== Assembly Election 2007 ===
2007 Manipur Legislative Assembly election: Mayang Imphal
Party	Candidate	Votes	%	±%
INC	Dr. Khumujam Ratankumar Singh	8,265	37.99%	12.10%
NCP	Maulana Abdus Salam	7,272	33.43%	
MPP	Meinam Nilchandra Singh	5,927	27.24%	
CPI	Ningthoujam Iboton Singh	194	0.89%	
Margin of victory		993	4.56%	4.15%
Turnout		21,756	93.03%	−0.16%
Registered electors		23,386		16.70%
INC gain from FPM		Swing	7.24%	

=== Assembly Election 2002 ===
2002 Manipur Legislative Assembly election: Mayang Imphal
Party	Candidate	Votes	%	±%
FPM	Meinam Nilchandra Singh	5,688	30.75%	
Manipur National Conference	Abdul Salam	5,612	30.34%	
INC	Kh. Amutombi Singh	4,789	25.89%	−1.66%
MSCP	Ningthoujam Iboton Singh	2,325	12.57%	−14.44%
Margin of victory		76	0.41%	−0.14%
Turnout		18,499	93.19%	−1.74%
Registered electors		20,039		5.80%
FPM gain from INC		Swing	-1.39%	

=== Assembly Election 2000 ===
2000 Manipur Legislative Assembly election: Mayang Imphal
Party	Candidate	Votes	%	±%
INC	Khumujam Amutombi Singh	4,780	27.55%	−4.58%
MSCP	Meinam Nilchandra Singh	4,685	27.00%	
SAP	Abdul Salam	4,138	23.85%	18.21%
MPP	Ningthoujam Iboton Singh	1,971	11.36%	
NCP	Abdul Jabar	754	4.35%	
CPI(M)	Chanambam Biren	470	2.71%	
RJD	Heigrujam Shyam Singh	170	0.98%	
BJP	Heikrujam Nikunja Singh	155	0.89%	
Independent	Thongam Nando Singh	114	0.66%	
Margin of victory		95	0.55%	−5.00%
Turnout		17,349	94.21%	−0.72%
Registered electors		18,940		3.40%
INC hold		Swing	-4.58%	

=== Assembly Election 1995 ===
1995 Manipur Legislative Assembly election: Mayang Imphal
Party	Candidate	Votes	%	±%
INC	Meinam Nilchandra Singh	5,488	32.13%	−0.50%
JD	Amutombi Khumujam Singh	4,541	26.59%	
Independent	Abdul Salam	4,336	25.39%	
CPI	H. Jugin Singh	1,674	9.80%	
SAP	Ch. Budhichandra	963	5.64%	
Margin of victory		947	5.55%	−2.77%
Turnout		17,078	94.93%	7.15%
Registered electors		18,318		−17.48%
INC gain from JD		Swing	-8.82%	

=== Assembly Election 1990 ===
1990 Manipur Legislative Assembly election: Mayang Imphal
Party	Candidate	Votes	%	±%
JD	Khumujam Amutombi Singh	7,907	40.95%	
INC	Meinam Nilchandra Singh	6,301	32.63%	−0.39%
MPP	Abdul Latip	5,100	26.41%	−3.54%
Margin of victory		1,606	8.32%	5.19%
Turnout		19,308	87.78%	3.90%
Registered electors		22,198		20.56%
JD gain from JP		Swing	4.80%	

=== Assembly Election 1984 ===
1984 Manipur Legislative Assembly election: Mayang Imphal
Party	Candidate	Votes	%	±%
JP	Meinam Nilchandra Singh	5,426	36.15%	
INC	Khumukcham Amutombi	4,957	33.03%	
MPP	Abdul Latip	4,495	29.95%	25.64%
BJP	H. Rajen Singh	130	0.87%	
Margin of victory		469	3.13%	−11.05%
Turnout		15,008	83.88%	0.46%
Registered electors		18,413		18.99%
JP gain from INC(I)		Swing	-0.35%	

=== Assembly Election 1980 ===
1980 Manipur Legislative Assembly election: Mayang Imphal
Party	Candidate	Votes	%	±%
INC(I)	Khunujam Amutombi	4,569	36.51%	
JP	Abdul Latip	2,795	22.33%	
INC(U)	Meinam Nilchandra Singh	2,779	22.21%	
CPI	Oinam Thambalngou	1,752	14.00%	−17.31%
MPP	Md. Alimuddin	539	4.31%	−32.13%
Independent	Md. Rajauddin	81	0.65%	
Margin of victory		1,774	14.17%	9.05%
Turnout		12,515	83.42%	−1.50%
Registered electors		15,475		31.00%
INC(I) gain from MPP		Swing	0.07%	

=== Assembly Election 1974 ===
1974 Manipur Legislative Assembly election: Mayang Imphal
Party	Candidate	Votes	%	±%
MPP	Abdul Latip	3,512	36.44%	11.39%
CPI	Khaidem Mangol Singh	3,018	31.31%	13.36%
Independent	Thongram Iboyaima Singh	2,443	25.35%	
Independent	Thokchom Tomchou	574	5.96%	
Margin of victory		494	5.13%	1.02%
Turnout		9,638	84.91%	−0.90%
Registered electors		11,813		19.95%
MPP gain from Independent		Swing	7.28%	

=== Assembly Election 1972 ===
1972 Manipur Legislative Assembly election: Mayang Imphal
Party	Candidate	Votes	%	±%
Independent	Abdul Latip	2,391	29.15%	
MPP	Khaidem Gulamjat Singh	2,054	25.05%	
CPI	Khaidem Mangol Singh	1,472	17.95%	
Independent	Yumkhaimbam Kumad	1,311	15.99%	
INC	Khoiram Tolangou	973	11.86%	−11.49%
Margin of victory		337	4.11%	−2.25%
Turnout		8,201	85.81%	0.14%
Registered electors		9,848		−36.62%
Independent hold		Swing	-4.01%	

=== Assembly Election 1967 ===
1967 Manipur Legislative Assembly election: Mayang Imphal
Party	Candidate	Votes	%	±%
Independent	C. Rajmohon	4,253	33.17%	
Independent	K. Gulamjat	3,438	26.81%	
INC	T. Toyaima	2,995	23.36%	
Independent	Suleiman	2,136	16.66%	
Margin of victory		815	6.36%	
Turnout		12,822	85.67%	
Registered electors		15,539		
Independent win (new seat)				

== See also ==
- Mayang Imphal
- Imphal West district
- List of constituencies of Manipur Legislative Assembly
