= Lamjaotongba Assembly constituency =

Constituency of the Manipur legislative assembly in India

Lamjaotongba
- Former constituency for the Manipur Legislative Assembly

Constituency details
- Country: India
- Region: Northeast India
- State: Manipur
- Established: 1972
- Abolished: 1972
- Total electors: 9,430

Lamjaotongba Assembly constituency was an assembly constituency in the Indian state of Manipur.

== Members of the Legislative Assembly ==
Election	Member	Party
1972	Nongthombam Ibomcha	Independent politician

== Election results ==
=== 1972 Assembly election ===
1972 Manipur Legislative Assembly election: Lamjaotongba
Party	Candidate	Votes	%	±%
Independent	Nongthombam Ibomcha	4,092	48.39%	New
INC	Thounaojam Tomba	2,669	31.56%	New
CPI	Mutum Janakinath	1,419	16.78%	New
MPP	Hijam Nityai	159	1.88%	New
Margin of victory		1,423	16.83%	
Turnout		8,457	89.68%	
Registered electors		9,430		
Independent win (new seat)				
