= Athokpam Assembly constituency =

Constituency of the Manipur legislative assembly in India

Coordinates: 24.62°N 94.00°E

Athokpam
- Former constituency for the Manipur Legislative Assembly

Constituency details
- Country: India
- Region: Northeast India
- State: Manipur
- Established: 1972
- Abolished: 1972
- Total electors: 8,535

Athokpam Assembly constituency was an assembly constituency in the Manipur state of India.

== Members of the Legislative Assembly ==
Election	Member	Party
1972	Md Chaoba	Manipur Peoples Party

== Election results ==
=== 1972 Assembly election ===
1972 Manipur Legislative Assembly election: Athokpam
Party	Candidate	Votes	%	±%
MPP	Md Chaoba	2,055	27.43%	New
Independent	Sorokhaibam Chourajit	2,034	27.15%	New
Independent	Athokpam Tunal	1,815	24.22%	New
Independent	Konsamibo	1,066	14.23%	New
INC	Kshetrimayum Chandra	335	4.47%	New
Margin of victory		21	0.28%	
Turnout		7,493	87.79%	
Registered electors		8,535		
MPP win (new seat)				
