= Top Chingtha Assembly constituency =

Constituency of the Manipur legislative assembly in India

Coordinates: 24.69°N 94.03°E

Top Chingtha
- Former constituency for the Manipur Legislative Assembly

Constituency details
- Country: India
- Region: Northeast India
- State: Manipur
- Established: 1967
- Abolished: 1972
- Total electors: 12,558

Top Chingtha was an assembly constituency in the Indian state of Manipur.

== Members of the Legislative Assembly ==
Election	Member	Party
1967	A. Ali	Independent
1972	Loitongbam Amujou Singh	Independent

== Election results ==
=== 1972 Assembly election ===
1972 Manipur Legislative Assembly election: Top Chingtha
Party	Candidate	Votes	%	±%
Independent	Loitongbam Amujou Singh	3,194	31.51%	New
MPP	Ashraf Ali	2,944	29.04%	New
INC	Abdul Haque	1,630	16.08%	▼3.09
Independent	John Vaiphei	1,363	13.44%	New
Independent	N. Dhaneshwar Singh	760	7.50%	New
Margin of victory		250	2.47%	▼4.12
Turnout		10,138	80.73%	▲6.15
Registered electors		12,558		▼34.60
Independent hold		Swing	▲5.49	

=== 1967 Assembly election ===
1967 Manipur Legislative Assembly election: Top Chingtha
Party	Candidate	Votes	%	±%
Independent	A. Ali	3,726	26.02%	New
CPI	P. P. Singh	2,783	19.43%	New
INC	N. N. Singh	2,745	19.17%	New
Independent	K. K. Singh	2,536	17.71%	New
Independent	Jamkhogin	784	5.47%	New
Independent	S. B. Singh	508	3.55%	New
CPI(M)	S. K. Singh	444	3.10%	New
Independent	T. G. Singh	135	0.94%	New
Margin of victory		943	6.58%	
Turnout		14,321	74.58%	
Registered electors		19,203		
Independent win (new seat)				
