= Lilong Chaji Assembly constituency =

Constituency of the Manipur legislative assembly in India

Lilong Chaji
- Former constituency for the Manipur Legislative Assembly

Constituency details
- Country: India
- Region: Northeast India
- State: Manipur
- Established: 1972
- Abolished: 1972
- Total electors: 10,686

Lilong Chaji Assembly constituency was an assembly constituency in the Indian state of Manipur.

== Members of the Legislative Assembly ==
| Election | Member | Party |
|---|---|---|
| 1972 | Irengbam Tompok | Manipur Peoples Party |

== Election results ==
=== 1972 Assembly election ===
1972 Manipur Legislative Assembly election: Lilong Chaji
| Party | Candidate | Votes | % | ±% |
|---|---|---|---|---|
| MPP | Irengbam Tompok | 3,379 | 40.67% | New |
| INC | Pukh Ambam Horedro | 2,438 | 29.34% | New |
| Independent | Ayepam Biramangol | 1,620 | 19.50% | New |
| CPI | Thangjam Thambaljao | 615 | 7.40% | New |
| Socialist Party (India) | Naorem Shyama | 134 | 1.61% | New |
| Margin of victory | | 941 | 11.33% | |
| Turnout | | 8,309 | 77.76% | |
| Registered electors | | 10,686 | | |
| MPP win (new seat) | | | | |
