= Kanjong Assembly constituency =

Constituency of the Manipur legislative assembly in India

Kanjong
- Former constituency for the Manipur Legislative Assembly

Constituency details
- Country: India
- Region: Northeast India
- State: Manipur
- Established: 1972
- Abolished: 1972
- Total electors: 9,029

Kanjong Assembly constituency was an assembly constituency in the Indian state of Manipur.

== Members of the Legislative Assembly ==
Election	Member	Party
1972	K. Envey	Independent politician

== Election results ==
=== 1972 Assembly election ===
1972 Manipur Legislative Assembly election: Kanjong
Party	Candidate	Votes	%	±%
Independent	K. Envey	2,922	51.29%	New
Independent	Kongsoi Lutthui	1,271	22.31%	New
INC	Ngazak	810	14.22%	New
Independent	M. Ningchui	615	10.80%	New
Margin of victory		1,651	28.98%	
Turnout		5,697	63.10%	
Registered electors		9,029		
Independent win (new seat)				
