= Malom Hiyanghang Assembly constituency =

Constituency of the Manipur legislative assembly in India

Malom Hiyanghang
- Former constituency for the Manipur Legislative Assembly

Constituency details
- Country: India
- Region: Northeast India
- State: Manipur
- Established: 1972
- Abolished: 1972
- Total electors: 9,983

Malom Hiyanghang Assembly constituency was an assembly constituency in the Indian state of Manipur.

== Members of the Legislative Assembly ==
Election	Member	Party
1972	Tokpam Sanajao Singh	Manipur Peoples Party

== Election results ==
=== 1972 Assembly election ===
1972 Manipur Legislative Assembly election: Malom Hiyanghang
Party	Candidate	Votes	%	±%
MPP	Tokpam Sanajao Singh	3,939	46.54%	New
INC	Raj Kumar Ranbir Singh	3,217	38.01%	New
CPI	Langoljam Iboyaima	1,135	13.41%	New
Margin of victory		722	8.53%	
Turnout		8,463	84.77%	
Registered electors		9,983		
MPP win (new seat)				
