= Kontha Assembly constituency =

Constituency of the Manipur legislative assembly in India

Kontha
- Former constituency for the Manipur Legislative Assembly

Constituency details
- Country: India
- Region: Northeast India
- State: Manipur
- Established: 1972
- Abolished: 1972
- Total electors: 8,099

Kontha Assembly constituency was an assembly constituency in the Indian state of Manipur.

== Members of the Legislative Assembly ==
Election	Member	Party
1972	R. K. Udaysana	Indian National Congress

== Election results ==
=== 1972 Assembly election ===
1972 Manipur Legislative Assembly election: Kontha
Party	Candidate	Votes	%	±%
INC	R. K. Udaysana	2,193	33.30%	New
Independent	Nongthombam Chaoba Singh	1,912	29.03%	New
MPP	Aribam Bimola Devi	1,301	19.75%	New
Independent	Wahengbam Nabachandra	800	12.15%	New
Socialist Party (India)	Sanglakpam Nityai Sharma	227	3.45%	New
Margin of victory		281	4.27%	
Turnout		6,586	81.32%	
Registered electors		8,099		
INC win (new seat)				
