= Babhruvahana =

Son of Arjuna in Mahābhārata

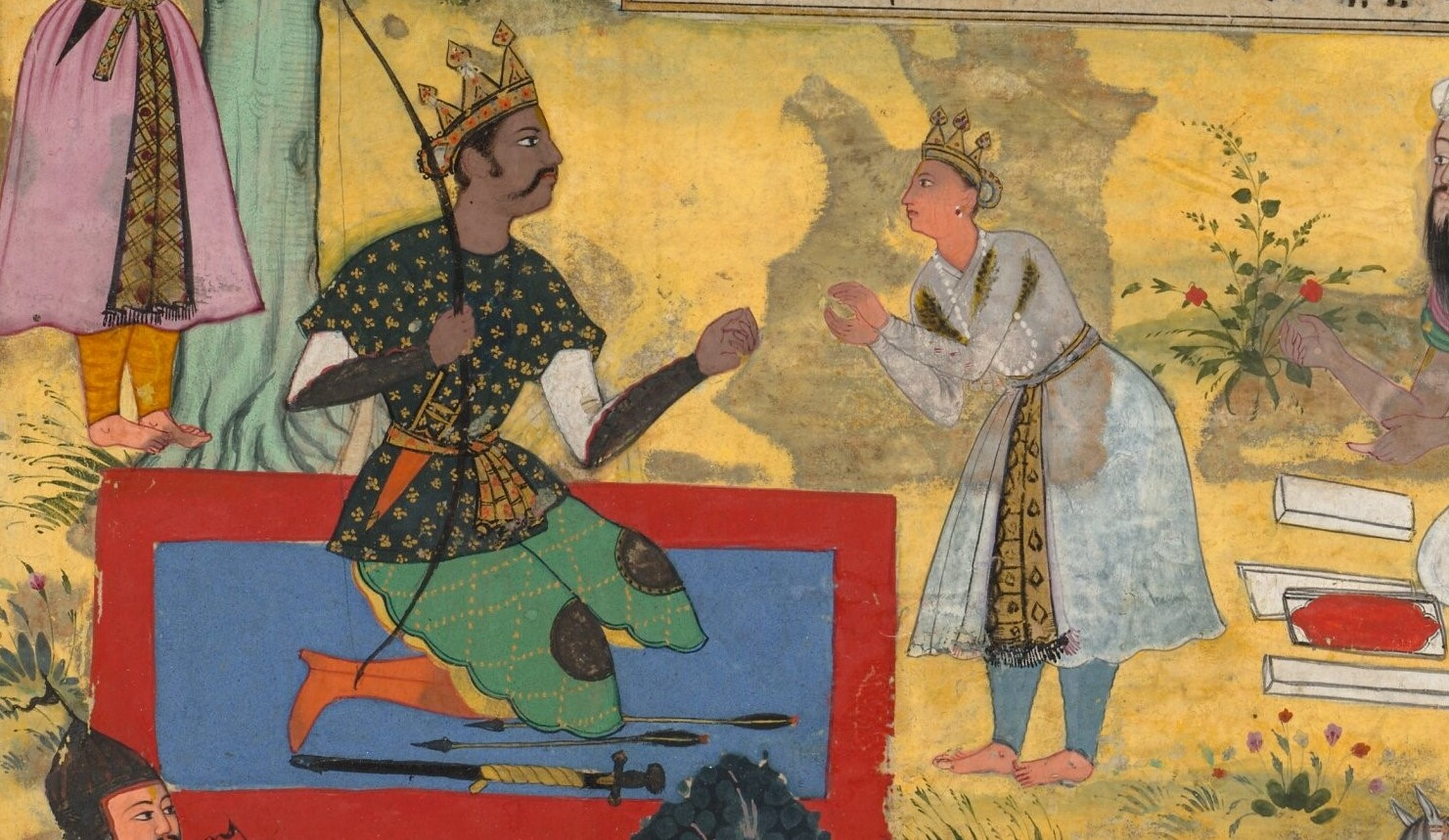
- Babhruvahana (right) greets Arjuna, folio from the Razmnama (Persian translation of the Mahabharata), c. 1600 CE

Information
- Gender: Male
- Weapon: Bow and arrows
- Family: Arjuna (father); Chitrangada (mother); Chitravahana (maternal-grandfather)
- Home: Manalura or Manipura

Babhruvahana (Sanskrit: बभ्रुवाहन, romanized: Babhruvāhana) is a character in the ancient Sanskrit epic, the Mahabharata (c. 400 BCE - 400 CE). He is the son of the Pandava prince Arjuna and Chitrangada, the princess of Manalura (also known as Manipura), and later becomes the king of his maternal kingdom. Though Babhruvahana doesn't participate in the Kurukshetra War, he plays a central role in the Ashvamedha of the Pandavas, where he is forced into a conflict with his father, Arjuna, and ultimately kills him, only for Arjuna to be revived later.

Babhruvahana's story gains popularity in the 12th-century Jaiminiya Ashvamedhika, which expands his role—including waging a war against the Nāgas (snakes) in the underworld to retrieve an elixir and a divine gem to revive Arjuna, whom he beheaded in this version. Numerous literary works, plays and movies have been based on his story.

== Biography ==
=== Birth ===
Babhruvahana's origins are detailed in the Adi Parva (Book 1) of the Mahabharata. During Arjuna's year-long exile from Indraprastha, he arrives in Manalura (later known as Manipura), ruled by King Chitravahana. The king's lineage traces back to Prabhanjana, who, through intense penance to the god Shiva, secured a boon ensuring each descendant has a son to continue the line. However, Chitravahana unexpectedly had a daughter, named Chitrangada, whom he raises as a putrika (a daughter whose son inherits her father's kingdom). When Arjuna asks the king his daughter's hand in marriage, an agreement is stipulated that any son born to the couple would remain in Manalura to inherit his maternal grandfather's throne, thus severing the son's lineal connection to his paternal genitor. Arjuna marries Chitrangada and stays in Manalura for three months. After departing, he returns to find that Chitrangada has given birth to their son, Babhruvahana. Arjuna promises to take Chitrangada and Babhruvahana later and continues his journey back to Indraprastha.

As per a pre-nuptial agreement, Chitrangada raises Babhruvahana in Manalura, and upon reaching maturity, Babhruvahana inherits the throne of Manalura.

=== Ashvamedha and later life ===
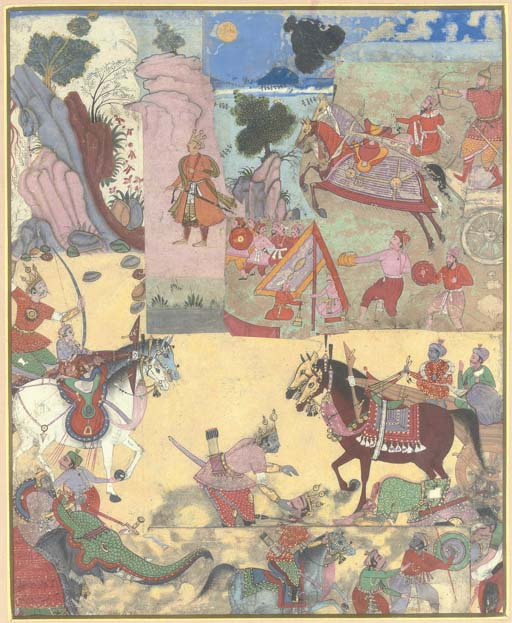
A painting depicting the battle between Babhruvahana and Arjuna, folio from Razmnama (16th-century Persian translation of the Mahabharata)

In the Ashvamedhika Parva (Book 14.78–82), Babhruvahana features prominently during Arjuna's Ashvamedha campaign, where Arjuna follows a sacrificial horse to assert his elder brother Yudhishthira's sovereignty after the Kurukshetra war. When Arjuna arrives in Babhruvahana's capital, now known as Manipura, Babhruvahana—in the company of scholars—initially greets his father respectfully. However, Arjuna is horrified by his son's lack of warrior spirit and provokes him to fight, accusing him of neglecting his kshatriyadharma (warrior duty) and behaving “like a woman”.

Ulupi, a princess of mythical Naga clan and Babhruvahana's stepmother, appears and urges Babhruvahana to seize the sacrificial horse and engage Arjuna in combat. In the ensuing battle, Babhruvahana strikes Arjuna with arrows, hitting him in the shoulder and chest. Arjuna falls dead, and Babhruvahana faints from the shock of his apparent patricide. Chitrangada, witnessing the scene, mourns Arjuna and blames Ulupi, accusing her of being a neglectful wife. Chitrangada vows to fast to death unless Arjuna is revived, and Babhruvahana joins her in this vow. Ulupi retrieves the Mritasanjivani stone (a divine gem of revival, also referred to as samjivanam manim or manir divyah) from the Naga realm and instructs Babhruvahana to place it on Arjuna's chest. Accompanied by auspicious cosmic signs, Arjuna revives and embraces Babhruvahana.

Ulupi reveals that her actions were not out of malice but a calculated move to save Arjuna from a divine curse. She explains that Arjuna had committed a war-crime by unjustly slaying his revered grandfather, Bhishma. For this, the Vasus (a class of deities) were going to curse him, with the approval of Ganga (Bhishma's mother). Ulupi's father, Kauravya, petitioned the Vasus, who agreed to commute the curse: Arjuna's guilt would be cleared if his son were to kill him, effectively repaying the debt for killing his own grandfather. Ulupi's urging of the combat was thus a selfless act intended to purge Arjuna of his sin.

Following the revival, Babhruvahana invites Arjuna to stay in Manipura, but Arjuna continues his Ashvamedha journey. Later, Babhruvahana, Chitrangada, and Ulupi travel together to Yudhisthira's capital, Hastinapura, for the festival. Upon arriving, Krishna presents Babhruvahana with a chariot drawn by divine horses. While Babhruvahana returns to rule Manipura, Chitrangada and Ulupi join the Hastinapura household, ultimately returning to their natal families only when the Pandavas embark on their final journey decades later.

== In derivative works ==
=== Jaiminiya Ashvamedhaparva ===
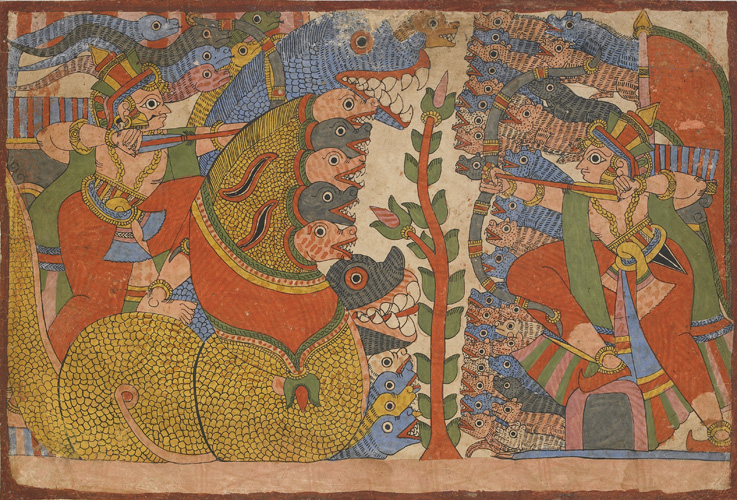
Babhruvahana along with his mongoose army fights the King of Nagas (snakes), from 19th century manuscript of Jaiminiya Ashvamedhika

Babhruvahana's story, while originating in Vyasa's Mahabharata, gains a more popular and highly adventurous retelling in the Jaiminiya Ashvamedhaparva, part of the 12th-century Jaiminibharata. This version, known for its focus on entertainment over philosophy, significantly expands Babhruvahana's role. In this telling, Babhruvahana is raised by Ulupi after his mother, Chitrangada (here, the daughter of a Gandharva king), leaves for Yudhishthira. The conflict with Arjuna begins when, upon their first meeting, Arjuna violently kicks Babhruvahana, instantly provoking a battle. The Jaimini version also features Babhruvahana defeating his uncle Bhima, slaying his cousin Vrishaketu and beheading Arjuna, a harsh difference from Vyasa's text. The cause of Arjuna's death is also different: the goddess Jvala instigates Ganga to curse Arjuna and then becomes the actual death-arrow that kills him, rather than the Vasus' curse from the Vyasa version.

The most notable expansion of Babhruvahana's role is the elaborate, six-chapter quest for Arjuna's revival. After Arjuna falls, the simple, immediate revival in Vyasa is replaced by high drama. When Ulupi's initial attempt to retrieve the life-giving jewel from the snake kingdom is thwarted by court intrigue, an enraged Babhruvahana personally invades the Naga kingdom in Patala (Underworld) with an army of mongoose. Following a great battle, he succeeds in seizing the amrita (elixir) and the Sanjivani jewel. However, this feat proves insufficient when Arjuna's severed head is stolen. The final act of revival requires the intervention of Krishna, who appears, retrieves the head using his divine power, and then uses the jewel to restore Arjuna to life.

=== Other ===
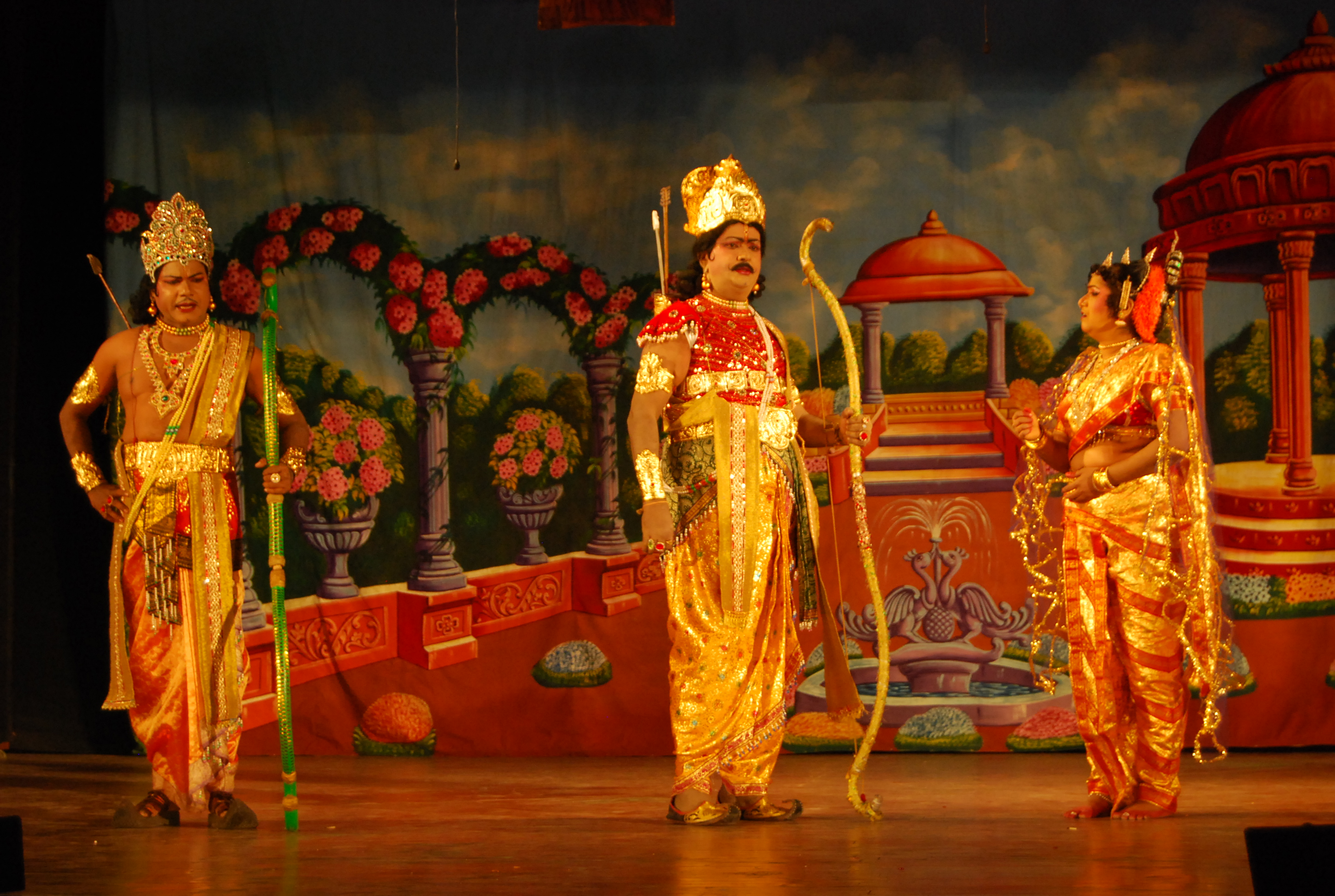
Actors playing Arjuna, Babhruvahana and Chitrangada in a play

Jaimini version of Babhruvahana's story has gained significant popularity throughout the Indian sub-continent, adapted into vernacular languages including Bengali, Kannada, Telugu, Assamese, Odia and Marathi. Numerous translations of the Mahabharata, including the 16th-century Persian Razmnama, feature Jaimini's version of Ashvamedhika Parva, despite claiming themselves being based on Vyasa's original version.

Babhruvahana's story, particularly the Jaimini version, has been adapted into numerous drama plays. It has also been adapted into multiple films, including Telugu versions in 1942 and 1964, two Hindi movies released in consecutive years, Veer Babruvahan (1951) and Veer Arjun (1952) and a Kannada film in 1977.

== Assessment ==
Babhruvahana is noted for his exclusion from the Kurukshetra War and his claim to the Kuru throne, both explained by the fact that he was not considered a Pandava heir due to the pre-nuptial agreement.

Scholar Simon Brodbeck, draws specific and interconnected assessments about Babhruvahana's actions in the Ashvamedhika Parva. Firstly, he notes that Arjuna's initial criticism—that Babhruvahana is neglecting the duty of a warrior (kshatriyadharma) and behaving like a woman—is a comment that plays directly on the maternality of Babhruvahana's inheritance from his mother, Chitrangada. Babhruvahana's matrifilial loyalty is also stressed; he fights at the command of his step-mother Ulupi, rather than his father Arjuna. This is presented as a deliberate contrast to his deceased half-brother Iravat (Ulupi's son), whose death was due to his patrifilial loyalty, ultimately suggesting that adherence to the maternal line spared Babhruvahana's life. Babhruvahana's armed resistance against Arjuna, despite his initial reluctance, actually represents his upholding the pre-nuptial agreement designed to sever his lineal relationship with his biological father.

Historically, regional works had attempted to identify Babhruvahana's ethnicity and origin, with some Tamil translations boldly claiming his maternal lineage as Pandyan, equating the city of Manipura with Madurai and identifying Chitravahana with Malayadhvaja Pandya. A few newer works describe Babhruvahana as of Meitei origin from the present-day northeastern state of Manipur; however, scholars have generally regarded both claims as inventions of translators or historically unsubstantiated. Modern scholars identify Babhruvahana's Kingdom in Kalinga, based on the geographical description in the epic.

== Bibliography ==
- Katz, Ruth Cecily (1 January 1990). Arjuna in the Mahabharata: Where Krishna Is, There Is Victory. Motilal Banarsidass. ISBN 978-81-208-0744-0.
- McGrath, Kevin (2016). Arjuna Pandava: The Double Hero in Epic Mahabharata. Orient Blackswan. ISBN 978-8-12506-309-4.
- Brodbeck, Simon Pearse (2 March 2017). The Mahabharata Patriline: Gender, Culture, and the Royal Hereditary. Routledge. ISBN 978-1-351-88630-7.
- Mani, Vettam (1975). Puranic encyclopaedia : a comprehensive dictionary with special reference to the epic and Puranic literature. Motilal Banarsidass. ISBN 978-0-8426-0822-0.
- Mazumdar, Subash (1988). Who is Who in the Mahabharata. Bharatiya Vidya Bhavan. p. 32.
