= 1972 Manipur Legislative Assembly election =

Legislative Assembly election in Manipur, India

- 6 March 1972

All 60 seats in the Manipur Legislative Assembly 31 seats needed for a majority
- Registered: 608,403
- Turnout: 75.89%

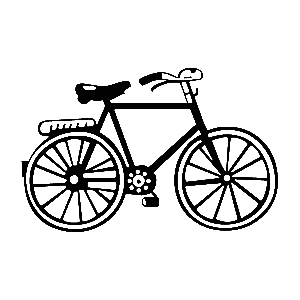
	Majority party	Minority party
Leader		Mohammed Alimuddin
Party	INC(R)	MPP
Leader's seat		Lilong
Seats before	16	New
Seats won	17	15
Seat change	▲1	–
Popular vote	30.02%	20.17%
CM before election
President's Rule
Elected CM
Mohammed Alimuddin
MPP

Elections to the Manipur Legislative Assembly were held in March 1972 to elect members of the 60 constituencies in Manipur, India. The Indian National Congress won the most seats, but Mohammed Alimuddin of the Manipur Peoples Party was appointed as the Chief Minister of Manipur.

After the passing of the North-Eastern Areas (Reorganisation) Act, 1971, Manipur was converted from a Union Territory to a State. The size of its Legislative Assembly was increased from 30 to 60 members.

== Result ==
Party	Votes	%	Seats	+/–
Indian National Congress	135,678	30.02	17	▲1
Manipur Peoples Party	91,148	20.17	15	New
Communist Party of India	45,765	10.13	5	▲4
Socialist Party (India, 1971)	24,195	5.35	3	New
Indian National Congress (Organisation)	10,699	2.37	1	New
Communist Party of India (Marxist)	2,988	0.66	0	0
Bharatiya Jana Sangh	1,004	0.22	0	New
Independents	140,471	31.08	19	+10
Total	451,948	100.00	60	▲30
Valid votes	451,948	97.89		
Invalid/blank votes	9,744	2.11		
Total votes	461,692	100.00		
Registered voters/turnout	608,403	75.89		
Source: ECI

== Elected members ==
Results by constituency
Assembly Constituency		Turnout %	Winner				Runner Up				Margin
#	Name	Turnout %	Name	Party	Votes	%	Name	Party	Votes	%	Margin
1	Sagolmang	78.09%	Telem Bir	INC	2,768	37.52%	Thingbaijam Nongyai	CPI	2,111	28.61%	657
2	Khundrakpam	85.30%	Thokchom Kunjo Singh	INC	1,863	25.66%	Maibam Hera Lairellakpam	CPI	1,649	22.71%	214
3	Kontha	81.32%	R. K. Udaysana	INC	2,193	33.30%	Nongthombam Chaoba Singh	Independent	1,912	29.03%	281
4	Khurai	75.23%	Atomba Ngairangbamcha	INC(O)	2,027	25.06%	K. Bathakur Sharma	Socialist Party (India, 1971)	1,987	24.57%	40
5	Wangkhei	71.37%	Seram Angouba Singh	INC	2,512	34.66%	Laishram Achewsingh	Socialist Party (India, 1971)	2,500	34.50%	12
6	Khergao	83.42%	Wangkhem Ibhol Singh	INC	2,561	29.03%	Abdul Wahid	MPP	2,003	22.70%	558
7	Thongju	80.75%	Oinam Tomba Singh	MPP	4,027	46.05%	Kshetrimayum Muhori Singh	INC	2,040	23.33%	1,987
8	Keirao	83.41%	Mohamad Jaluddin	MPP	3,964	51.15%	Phanijoubam Muhol Singh	INC	2,449	31.60%	1,515
9	Lamlai	75.68%	Pheiroijam Parijat Singh	CPI	2,331	25.77%	Telem Nityai	INC	1,912	21.13%	419
10	Top Chingtha	80.73%	Loitongbam Amujou Singh	Independent	3,194	31.51%	Ashraf Ali	MPP	2,944	29.04%	250
11	Mayang Imphal	85.81%	Abdul Latip	Independent	2,391	28.29%	Khaidem Gulamjat Singh	MPP	2,054	24.30%	337
12	Wangoi	88.41%	Chungkham Rajmohan Singh	MPP	3,794	46.34%	Wanhengbam Nipamacha	INC	3,330	40.67%	464
13	Lilong Chaji	77.76%	Irengbam Tompok	MPP	3,379	40.67%	Pukh Ambam Horedro	INC	2,438	29.34%	941
14	Singjamei	79.16%	Loitongbam Sarat Singh	MPP	2,024	23.93%	Haobam Baruni Singh	INC	2,013	23.80%	11
15	Sagolband	85.90%	Thokchom Bira	CPI	2,427	41.42%	Salam Gambhir	MPP	2,106	35.94%	321
16	Lamjaotongba	89.68%	Nongthombam Ibomcha	Independent	4,092	48.39%	Thounaojam Tomba	INC	2,669	31.56%	1,423
17	Keishamthong	77.24%	Lasihram Manobi	Independent	2,066	24.92%	L. Bhagyachandra Singh	Independent	1,665	20.08%	401
18	Malom Hiyanghang	84.77%	Tokpam Sanajao Singh	MPP	3,939	46.54%	Raj Kumar Ranbir Singh	INC	3,217	38.01%	722
19	Uripok	75.47%	M. Meghachandra	CPI	2,743	44.23%	Khaidem Rajmani	INC	1,932	31.16%	811
20	Thangmeiband	68.20%	Shagolsemi Bomcha	INC	3,249	43.07%	Maibam Gouramani	MPP	2,080	27.58%	1,169
21	Lamsang	80.22%	Laishram Samungouba Singh	MPP	2,108	27.41%	K. Jugeshwar	CPI	1,943	25.26%	165
22	Sekmai	75.97%	Khwairakpam Chaoba	MPP	2,930	48.61%	Khangembam Leirijao	INC	2,915	48.37%	15
23	Konthoujam	83.16%	Khangembam Lakshman	MPP	2,942	38.31%	Thangjam Babu	CPI	2,527	32.91%	415
24	Patsoi	86.95%	L. Chandramani	Independent	3,002	42.86%	Akojam Kulachandra	INC	2,359	33.68%	643
25	Nambol	85.28%	Thounaojam Chaoba Singh	MPP	5,007	52.22%	H. Shamkishore Sharma	INC	4,436	46.27%	571
26	Oinam	85.55%	Yumnam Yaima	MPP	4,585	54.90%	Mutu Amutombi	INC	3,581	42.88%	1,004
27	Bishnupur	79.79%	Khaidem Ratha	INC	3,170	34.29%	Akoijam Ketuko	Socialist Party (India, 1971)	2,336	25.27%	834
28	Thanga	80.79%	Haobijam Kangjamba	Socialist Party (India, 1971)	2,878	40.47%	Salam Jayantakumar Singh	INC	1,856	26.10%	1,022
29	Kumbi	78.26%	Mairembam Koireng	INC	2,961	29.57%	Raidali	Independent	2,889	28.85%	72
30	Moirang	80.98%	Hemam Nilamani	Independent	3,076	39.45%	Kiyam	INC	2,955	37.89%	121
31	Lilong	88.05%	Mohammed Alimuddin	MPP	4,456	56.48%	Abdul Gani	INC	3,289	41.69%	1,167
32	Khekman	90.56%	Habibur Ramam	INC	3,790	44.10%	Thoudam Krishna Singh	MPP	3,779	43.97%	11
33	Thoubal	87.24%	Langpoklakpam Chadyaima	MPP	4,290	53.17%	Waikhom Mani	INC	1,807	22.39%	2,483
34	Athokpam	87.79%	Md Chaoba	MPP	2,055	27.43%	Sorokhaibam Chourajit	Independent	2,034	27.15%	21
35	Khangabok	82.03%	Thokchom Achouba	CPI	3,623	47.11%	M. D. Kutub Ali	Independent	2,460	31.99%	1,163
36	Heirok	87.20%	Mibotombi Singh	INC	3,401	36.76%	Moirangthem Yaima	CPI	2,282	24.67%	1,119
37	Wangjing Tentha	85.74%	Naorem Kunjobapu	MPP	2,679	31.91%	Laisram Khomdon	INC(O)	2,180	25.97%	499
38	Kakching	88.13%	Yengkhom Nimai	Socialist Party (India, 1971)	3,544	35.03%	Mayanglambam I Botobi	INC	3,345	33.06%	199
39	Hiyanglam	80.93%	Huidrom Rajbapu Singh	Socialist Party (India, 1971)	2,154	23.02%	Naorem Kanhai Singh	INC	2,067	22.09%	87
40	Sugnu	82.90%	Mayanglambam Nilla	CPI	3,512	36.80%	Mayanglambam Kamal	INC	3,403	35.66%	109
41	Chandel	76.36%	H. T. Thungam	Independent	6,064	58.40%	Linus Liankhohao	INC	4,163	40.09%	1,901
42	Tengnoupal	68.55%	L Rongman	INC	3,191	48.98%	Solim Baite	Independent	1,250	19.19%	1,941
43	Phungyar	66.28%	Rishang Keishing	Independent	2,849	64.05%	Stephen Angkang	INC	975	21.92%	1,874
44	Kanjong	63.10%	K. Envey	Independent	2,922	51.29%	Kongsoi Lutthui	Independent	1,271	22.31%	1,651
45	Chingai	74.81%	P. Peter	Independent	1,666	27.31%	Som I	Independent	1,069	17.52%	597
46	Ukhrul	74.04%	Yangmaso Shaiza	Independent	4,055	58.61%	L Solomon	INC	1,892	27.34%	2,163
47	Saikul	65.30%	R Vio	Independent	2,053	25.22%	Thongkhopao	Independent	1,316	16.17%	737
48	Liyai	70.70%	S.P. Henry	Independent	2,853	36.37%	Khos U Thikho	Independent	2,482	31.64%	371
49	Mao	64.40%	Asosu Ashiho	INC	2,242	35.57%	James Lokho Kolakhe	Independent	2,013	31.94%	229
50	Karong	57.87%	Athikho Daiho	INC	2,747	30.45%	Ngulkholam Haokip	Independent	2,052	22.75%	695
51	Saitu	63.97%	Paolen	INC	1,224	16.35%	Seikhohao	Independent	1,051	14.04%	173
52	Tamei	59.65%	Pauheu	Independent	1,224	23.40%	R. Rajanglung	Independent	1,182	22.60%	42
53	Tamenglong	57.07%	T. P. Kiuliangpou	Independent	1,435	34.47%	Dijingang	Independent	1,060	25.46%	375
54	Nungba	53.46%	Kalanlung	INC	1,374	36.55%	Pougailung	Independent	885	23.54%	489
55	Jiribam	0.00%	S. Bijoy	INC	(UNCONTESTED)						
56	Tipaimukh	71.25%	Ngurdinglien Sanate	Independent	3,866	57.14%	Selkai Hrangohal	INC	2,790	41.24%	1,076
57	Thanlon	64.85%	N Gouzagin	Independent	2,677	50.42%	Nengkhosuan	Independent	1,334	25.13%	1,343
58	Henglep	81.65%	Holkhomang	Independent	5,140	48.10%	Lhingianeng Gangte	INC	3,177	29.73%	1,963
59	Singhat	75.70%	Thangkhanlal	INC	5,166	48.59%	Kulzaoal	Independent	3,002	28.24%	2,164
60	Churachandpur	78.07%	Haokholal Thangjom	Independent	2,824	27.95%	Goukhenpau	INC	2,523	24.97%	301

== See also ==
- List of constituencies of the Manipur Legislative Assembly
- 1972 elections in India
