= Liyai Assembly constituency =

Constituency of the Manipur legislative assembly in India

Liyai
- Former constituency for the Manipur Legislative Assembly

Constituency details
- Country: India
- Region: Northeast India
- State: Manipur
- Established: 1972
- Abolished: 1972
- Total electors: 11,094

Liyai Assembly constituency was an assembly constituency in the Indian state of Manipur.

== Members of the Legislative Assembly ==
Election	Member	Party
1972	S. P. Henry	Independent politician

== Election results ==
=== 1972 Assembly election ===
1972 Manipur Legislative Assembly election: Liyai
Party	Candidate	Votes	%	±%
Independent	S. P. Henry	2,853	36.37%	New
Independent	Khos U Thikho	2,482	31.64%	New
INC	D Thoiso	2,387	30.43%	New
Margin of victory		371	4.73%	
Turnout		7,844	70.70%	
Registered electors		11,094		
Independent win (new seat)				
