= Abdul Latip =

Manipur politician

Muhammad Abdul Latip

Member of Manipur Legislative Assembly
- In office 1972–1979
- Preceded by: C . Rajmohon
- Succeeded by: Khumujam Amutombi Singh
- Constituency: Mayang Imphal

Personal details
- Political party: Manipur Peoples Party

Muhammad Abdul Latip is an Indian politician and former two-time member of the Manipur Legislative Assembly.

== Career ==
He participated in the 1972 Manipur Legislative Assembly election from Mayang Imphal constituency in Imphal West district as an independent candidate, He won the election, defeating his rival Khaidem Gulamjat Singh of the MPP. During the 1974 Manipur Legislative Assembly election, he ran as a Manipur Peoples Party politician and was successful once again, defeating his rival Khaidem Mangol of the Communist Party of India. In 1980, he contested as a Janata Party candidate but lost to Khunujam Amutombi of INC(I).
