= Mairembam Koireng Singh =

1st Chief Minister of Manipur

1st Chief Minister of Manipur
- In office 1 July 1963 – 11 January 1967
- Preceded by: Position Created
- Succeeded by: President's rule
- In office 20 March 1967 – 4 October 1967
- Preceded by: President's rule
- Succeeded by: Longjam Thambou Singh
- In office 16 February 1968 – 16 October 1969
- Preceded by: Longjam Thambou Singh
- Succeeded by: Mohammed Alimuddin

Personal details
- Born: Mairembam Koireng Singh; 19 December 1915 Moirang, Manipur, India
- Died: 27 December 1994 (aged 79)
- Spouse: (L) Kiyam Ningol Mairembam Ongbi Ibemhal Devi

Mairembam Koireng Singh (1915–1994), also known as Moirang Koireng, was an Indian politician and activist. Affiliated to the Indian National Congress, Mairembam Koireng Singh became the first Chief Minister of Manipur and governed the state for three terms between 1963 and 1969.

Born on 19 December 1915 in Moirang, Manipur, Singh was an outspoken critic of the social inequalities endorsed by the Manipur monarchy, particularly opposing a tax imposed on the underprivileged for wearing the "Chandan Tilak" on their foreheads.

Singh played a pivotal role in the Satyagraha campaign concerning the Lord Thangjing Temple issue, successfully advocating for the transfer of control over religious activities to the public in 1952. He was also influential in the establishment of several educational institutions. Singh's political career began in 1938 with the founding of the Nikhil Manipuri Mahasabha, in response to Mahatma Gandhi's call for revolution.

In 1944, following a call from Subhas Chandra Bose (Netaji), Singh joined the Indo-Japanese Progress Group and committed to supporting the broader war effort. When the British authorities labeled him an "enemy" and issued a "shoot at sight" order, he went into hiding and fled to Burma with his associates in July 1944.

Singh met with Netaji in September 1944. The following year, in September 1945, the British arrested and imprisoned him for eight months. Upon his release under a royal pardon in April 1946, Singh returned to Manipur via Calcutta.

== Political activism ==
In 1938, Koireng's life reached a significant turning point. At the age of 23, he joined the Nikhil Manipuri Mahasabha, an organization opposing the oppressive rule of the Manipuri King. That same year, he married Ibemhal Devi and made a conscious decision not to pursue formal education, instead dedicating himself to political activism.

During the World War II, on the morning of 14 April 1944, Koireng, along with leaders such as Leiphrakpam Sanaba, Kumam Kanglen, and Meinam Mani, welcomed the Indo-Japanese Advanced Party at Tronglaobi (Moirang). They discussed the conditions for India's independence. Following these discussions, INA Colonel Saukat Ali Malik hoisted the Tricolour flag for the first time, marking Moirang as the first independent territory in India. The event was attended by Koireng, Captain Ito of the 33rd Japanese Mountain Gun Regiment, and local residents.

During this period, Koireng provided significant support to the Azad Hind Fauz (Indian National Army) by supplying food grains from his father's granary, without parental consent, to sustain thousands of soldiers for three months. In response to these actions, the British Political Agent in Moirang declared the area as "Enemy Soil" and branded Koireng, along with Kiyam Gopal Singh, Leiphrakpam Sanaba Singh, and Hemam Neelmani Singh, as traitors, ordering their execution on sight.

=== Revolt for Thangjing Temple ===
After the Independence of India in 1947, the custodianship of the Ibudhou Thangjing Temple, traditionally governed by the King of Moirang, remained unchanged under the Merger Agreement of 1949. However, Shri Bodhchandra Singh, the Meitei King, declared the deity as the "King’s God" and appropriated the temple's offerings.

In response, the people of Moirang, led by Shri Koireng Singh, revolted in May 1950, demanding that the deity be recognized as the "People’s God" and that the celebration of "Lai Haraoba" should be managed by the local populace. This uprising became known as the "Thangjing Andolan." The Meitei King dispatched a contingent of riflemen under SP L Gopal and Sub-Inspector L Jadumani to suppress the revolt, enforcing Section 144 of the Code of Criminal Procedure around the temple. The police, under the direction of Chief Commissioner Shri Himat Singh, dispersed the protesters with force, resulting in numerous injuries, including to Koireng Singh.

Subsequently, the local population boycotted the temple officials appointed by the Meitei King, pursuing legal action to transfer control of the temple to the community. The Member of Parliament at the time, Laishram Jugeshwar, supported these legal efforts. The Meitei King was summoned to court, a situation that created considerable unrest in his court. Eventually, a consensus was reached that the temple should be governed by the people, leading to the formation of the "Thangjing Seva Mandal."

This movement marked a significant shift, and Ibudhou Thangjing is now regarded as the "People’s God." The events of this period are still remembered by the people of Moirang as a testament to Koireng Singh's leadership and efforts.

== Political career ==
He was elected as Chief Minister of Manipur thrice (1st, 2nd and 4th ) and he governed the state for 5 years and 266 days in three terms between 1963 and 1969.

The chronological order of the elections Koireng fought in his life may be summarised as follows:

Sl No	Year	Party	Constituency	Won/Lost	Election Type
1	1948	Congress	Moirang	Won	MLA
2	1952	Congress	Moirang-Bishnupur	Won	Electoral College Member
3	1957	Congress	Thanga-Kumbi	Won	Territorial Council Member
4	1962	Congress	Thanga-Kumbi	Won	Territorial Council Member
5	1967	Congress	Thanga-Kumbi	Won	MLA
6	1972	Congress	Kumbi	Won	MLA
7	1974	Congress	Kumbi	Lost	MLA
8	1980	Janata	Moirang	Won	MLA
9	1985	Janata	Moirang	Won	MLA
10	1990	Congress	Moirang	Won	MLA

Award-

Tabra Patra, 1972 (awarded to the Freedom Fighters of Azad Hind Fauz).

Great Works-

1. Setting up of Loktak Multi Purpose Project, Loktak Moirang

2. Building Indian National Army (INA) Martyr’s Memorial Complex, Moirang.

3. Constructing Moirang Thanga Road and Imphal Tamenglong Road.

4. Setting up of All India Radio (AIR) in Manipur.

5. Setting up of Regional Medical College (RMC) now known as Regional Institute of Medical Sciences (RIMS).

Death-

Mairembam Koireng Singh took his last breath on 27 December 1994 after prolonged illness.
