= Sagolmang Assembly constituency =

Sagolmang
- Former constituency for the Manipur Legislative Assembly

Constituency details
- Country: India
- Region: Northeast India
- State: Manipur
- District: Imphal East
- Lok Sabha constituency: Inner Manipur
- Established: 1967
- Abolished: 1972

Sagolmang Legislative Assembly constituency was a Legislative Assembly constituency of Manipur state in India. It is now defunct.

== Members of the Legislative Assembly ==
Year	Winner	Party
1967	M. Ibohal	Communist Party of India
1972	Telem Bir	Indian National Congress

== Election results ==
Vote share of winning candidates
1972	38.30%
1967	36.84%

=== 1972 Assembly election ===
1972 Manipur Legislative Assembly election: Sagolmang
Party	Candidate	Votes	%	±%
INC	Telem Bir	2,768	38.30%	16.63%
CPI	Thingbaijam Nongyai	2,111	29.21%	−7.64%
INC(O)	Ngangom Herachando	926	12.81%	
CPI(M)	Yumlembam Kula	798	11.04%	4.75%
MPP	Ningombam Ningthemjao	625	8.65%	
Margin of victory		657	9.09%	−6.08%
Turnout		7,228	78.09%	4.78%
Registered electors		9,448		−36.70%
INC gain from CPI		Swing	1.45%	

=== 1967 Assembly election ===
1967 Manipur Legislative Assembly election: Sagolmang
Party	Candidate	Votes	%	±%
CPI	M. Ibohal	3,856	36.84%	
INC	T. B. Singh	2,268	21.67%	
Independent	L. Birachandra	1,856	17.73%	
PSP	W. Kullo	879	8.40%	
Independent	T. Komlajao	785	7.50%	
CPI(M)	Y. K. Singh	658	6.29%	
Independent	T. Bokul	164	1.57%	
Margin of victory		1,588	15.17%	
Turnout		10,466	73.31%	
Registered electors		14,925		
CPI win (new seat)				

== See also ==
- List of constituencies of the Manipur Legislative Assembly
- Imphal East district
