= Ulupi =

Indian mythological serpent princess

- Mahabharata character
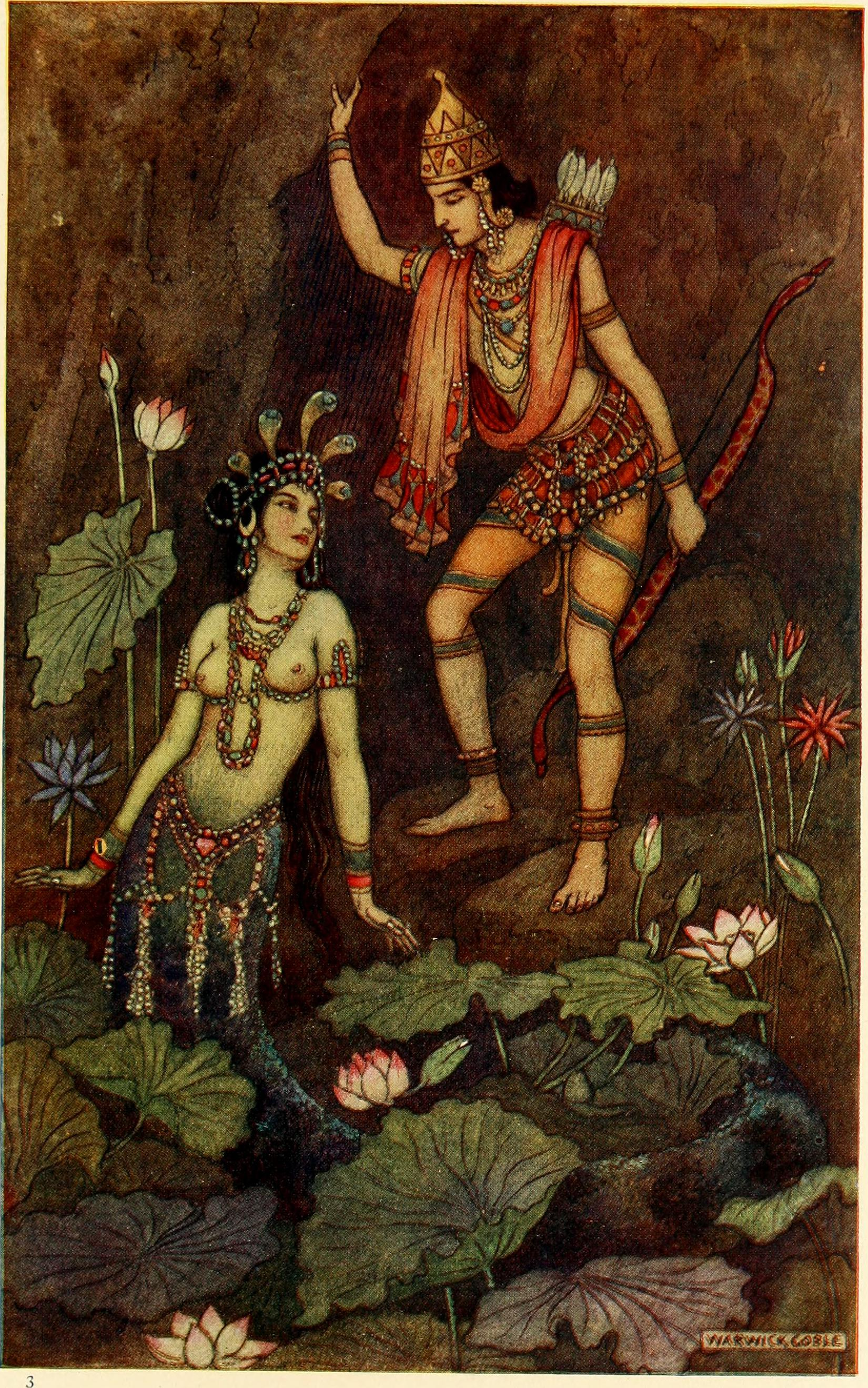
- An illustration by Warwick Goble depicting Arjuna meeting Ulupi

Information
- Race: Naga
- Family: Kauravya (father)
- Spouses: An unnamed Naga (first husband; deceased); Arjuna
- Children: Iravan
- Relatives: Kunti (mother-in-law); The Pandavas (brothers-in-law)

Ulupi (Ulūpī), also known as Uluchi and Ulupika, is a Naga princess mentioned in the Hindu epic Mahabharata. Ulupi is the daughter of the king Kauravya, and is the second wife of Arjuna. She also finds a mention in the Vishnu Purana and the Bhagavata Purana.

Ulupi is said to have met and married Arjuna when he was in exile, and with whom she bore his son Iravan. She is also credited with redeeming Arjuna from the curse of the Vasus by restoring his life after he was slain in a battle by his son, Babhruvahana.

== Etymology and form ==
Little is said about Ulupi in the Mahabharata. Ulupi is known by numerous names in the Mahabharata—Bhujagātmajā, Bhujagendrakanyakā, Bhujagottamā Kauravī, Kauravyaduhitā, Kauravyakulanandinī, Pannaganandinī, Pannagasutā, Pannagātmajā, Pannageśvarakanyā, Pannagī, and Uragātmajā.

Ulupi is described as a mythical form of a Nāgakanyā (Nāga princess), half-maiden and half-serpent. Wm. Michael Mott in his Caverns, Cauldrons, and Concealed Creatures described Ulupi as "partly reptilian" – the portion below the waist resembles that of a snake or a crocodile.

== Early life ==
Ulupi was the daughter of the Naga King Kauravya. Her father ruled the underwater kingdom of serpents in the Ganga river. She was a well-trained warrior. While Ulupi’s introduction in the epic does not mention it, it is later revealed during the Kurukshetra war that she had a previous husband before meeting Arjuna, who died fighting Suparna, leaving her widowed and childless.

== Marriage with Arjuna ==
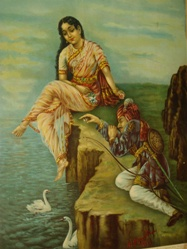
Ulupi and Arjuna

Arjuna, the third Pandava brother, was exiled from Indraprastha, the capital city of the kingdom, to go on a twelve-year pilgrimage as a penance for violating the terms of his marriage to Draupadi, the brothers' common wife. Accompanied by Brahmins, Arjuna went to the north eastern region of present-day India.

One day, when Arjuna was bathing in the Ganga river to perform his rituals, the Naga princess Ulupi, grasps him and pulls him into the river. She holds him with her hands and forces him to travel under her will. They finally end up in an underwater kingdom, the abode of Kauravya. Arjuna comes across a sacrificial fire there and offers his rites to the fire. Agni is pleased with Arjuna's unhesitating offering of oblations.

Still smiling, Arjuna enquires Ulupi about her background, to which she responds thus:

Hearing these words of Arjuna, Ulupi answered,

'There is a Naga of the name of Kauravya, born in the line of Airavata. I am, O prince, the daughter of that Kauravya, and my name is Ulupi.

O tiger among men, beholding you descend into the stream to perform your ablutions, I was deprived of reason by the god of desire.

O sinless one, I am still unmarried. Afflicted as I am by the god of desire on account of you, O you of Kuru’s race, gratify me today by giving thyself up to me.'

— Vyasa, Mahabharata, Arjuna-vanava Parva, Section 216

Arjuna, however, declines her proposal citing his celibacy on his pilgrimage. Ulupi argues that his celibacy is limited only to Draupadi, Arjuna's first wife. Convinced by her argument, Arjuna marries her, spending the night in the mansion of the Naga and rose with the sun in the morning. Later, a son named Iravan was born to them. Pleased by Arjuna, Ulupi grants him a boon that every amphibious creature shall, without doubt, be capable of being vanquished by him.

Ulupi loses her son Iravan in the Kurukshetra War, where he is slain fighting on his father's side.

== Redeeming Arjuna from the curse ==
The Vasus, Bhishma's brothers, cursed Arjuna after he killed Bhishma through treachery in the Kurukshetra War. When Ulupi heard of the curse, she sought the help of her father, Kauravya. Her father went to the river goddess Ganga, Bhishma's mother, and requested her for a relief from the curse. Upon hearing him, Ganga said that Arjuna would be killed by his own son, Babhruvahana—Arjuna's son through Chitrangada—and brought back to life when Ulupi placed a gem called Nagamani on his chest.

Following her father's advice, Ulupi instigates Babruvāhana to fight Arjuna. When Arjuna goes to Manipura with the horse intended for the Ashvamedha sacrifice, the king Babhruvahana, as directed by Ulupi, challenges Arjuna to a duel. In the fierce battle that took place between them, both are mangled by the other's arrows. Finally, Arjuna is mortally wounded and is killed by his son when he shoots a powerful arrow at him. Chitrangada rushes to the spot and abuses Ulupi for instigating Babhruvahana to fight Arjuna. Repenting of his deed, Babhruvahana is determined to kill himself, but is promptly stopped by Ulupi. She goes to her kingdom and brings the Nagamani. When she places the Nagamani on Arjuna's chest, his life is restored, thus relieving him of the Vasus' curse. When brought back to his life, Arjuna becomes happy to see Ulupi, Chitrangada, and Babhruvahana. He takes all of them to Hastinapura.

== Retirement of the Pandavas ==
Upon the onset of the Kali Yuga, the Pandavas along with Draupadi retired and left the throne to their only heir – Arjuna's grandson, Parikshit. Giving up all their belongings and ties, they made their final journey of pilgrimage to the Himalayas, accompanied by a dog. Ulupi went back to her kingdom in the Ganga river.

== Bibliography ==
- Chandramouli, Anuja (2012). ARJUNA: Saga Of A Pandava Warrior-Prince. Leadstart Publishing Pvt Ltd. ISBN 978-93-81576-39-7.
- Debroy, Bibek (2010). The Mahabharata: Volume 2. Penguin Books. p. 536. ISBN 978-0-14-310013-3.
- Sweety, Dr.Shinde (2015). Arjun: Without A Doubt. Leadstart Publishing PvtLtd. ISBN 978-93-81836-97-2.
- Vogel, Jean Philippe (1926). Indian Serpent-lore: Or, The Nāgas in Hindu Legend and Art. Asian Educational Services. ISBN 978-81-206-1071-2.
- Thadani, N. (1931). The Mystery of the Mahabharata. Vol. 4. India Research Press. GGKEY:EUL3QR74A0R.
- Vettam, Mani (1975). Puranic Encyclopaedia: A Comprehensive Dictionary With Special Reference to the Epic and Puranic Literature. Delhi: Motilal Banarsidass. ISBN 0-8426-0822-2.
