= Ashvamedhika Parva =

Fourteenth book of the Mahabharata

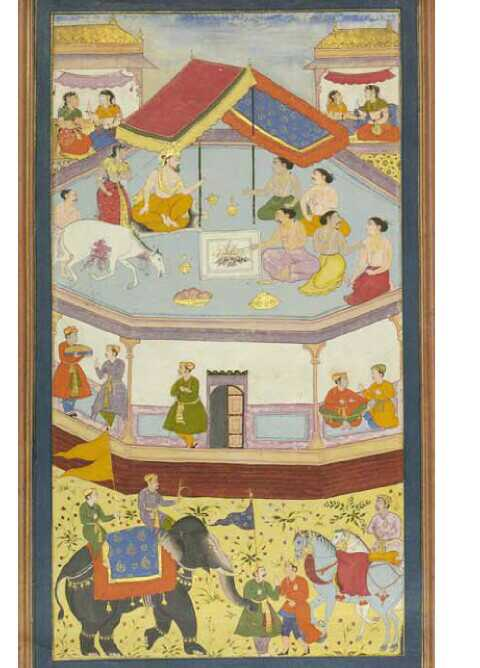
Ashwamedha yagna of Yudhishthira

The Ashvamedhika Parva (Sanskrit: अश्वमेध पर्व) is the fourteenth of the eighteen parvas (books) of the Indian epic Mahabharata. It traditionally has 2 parts and 96 chapters. The critical edition has one sub-book and 92 chapters.

Ashvamedhika Parva begins with advice from Krishna and Vyasa who recommend Yudhishthira to perform the Ashvamedha ceremony.

Yudhishthira discloses that the treasury is empty because of the war. Krishna suggests mining gold in Himavat, near mount Meru. He recites the story of king Muratta. Yudhishthira proceeds with the effort to mine gold, fill his treasury and perform the Ashvamedhika ceremony.

The book includes Anugita parva, over 36 chapters, which Krishna describes as mini Bhagavad Gita. The chapters are recited because Arjuna tells Krishna that he is unable to recollect the wisdom of Bhagavad Gita in the time of peace, and would like to listen to Krishna's wisdom again. Krishna recites Anugita (lit. 'Subsequent Gita') as a dialogue between a Brahmin's wife and Brahma. Scholars have suggested Anugita to be a spurious addition to Ashvamedhika Parva in medieval times, and a corruption of the original Mahabharata.

== Structure and chapters ==
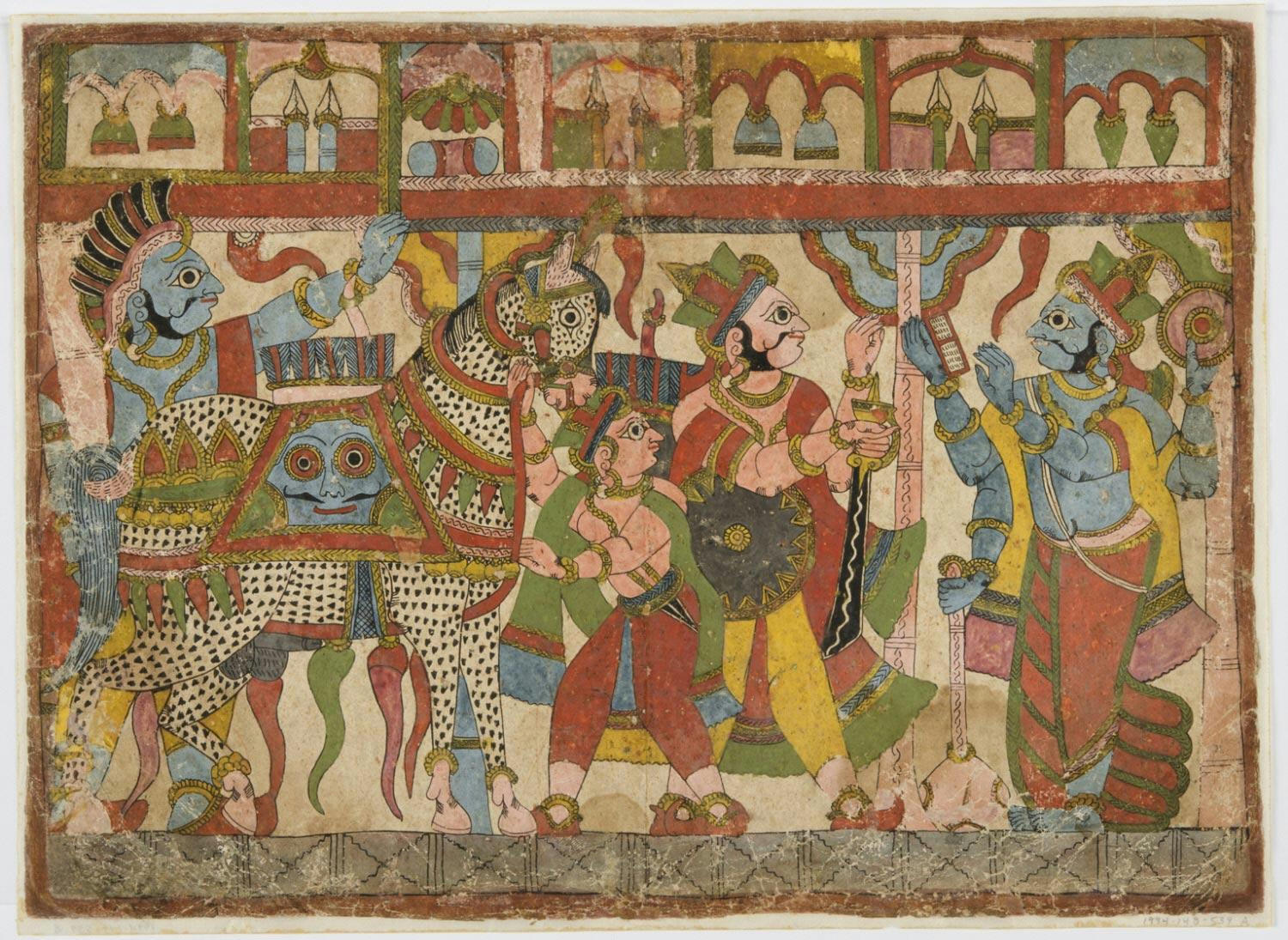
Krishna Advising on the Ashwamedha Yajna

The Ashvamedhika Parva traditionally has 2 upa-parvas (parts, little books) and 96 adhyayas (chapters). The following are the sub-parvas:

1. Aswamedhika Parva (chapters: 1–15)
2. Anugita Parva (chapters: 16–96)

The Parva starts with Yudhishthira overwhelmed with grief again sighing on the death of his relatives. Dhritrashtra, Vyasa and Vasudeva consoles him with narration of stories to give up affliction and perform a sacrifice with presents for fame. The Anugita sub-parva recites a restatement of Bhagavad Gita teachings by Krishna to Arjuna. Arjuna asks Krishna to repeat the holy discourse, what he told to him in time of battle as that has been forgotten by him. Krishna shows his disagreement and says that either he is destitute of faith or his understanding is not good as that discourse is impossible to repeat, in detail, what he told him in higher state. However, out of affection, Krishna tells him other ancient stories to help know the nature of Brahman. After this, Krishna returns to Dwaraka and on his way he meets ascetic Utanka. The sage tries to curse Krishna for not doing enough to avert the war. Krishna apologizes for his act but tells him that low level curses cannot put him down and curses cause destruction of merit. He tells him that he strove his best for peace, but it is impossible to transgress destiny by either intelligence or might. He then discourse him on Darkness, Passion and Goodness, saying Dharma is very dear to him, so in every yuga he took birth in diverse wombs, for restoring it, with the aid of others. He did this for protecting Righteousness and for establishing it. Whether he live among deities, Gandharvas, Nagas, Yakshas or Rakshasas, he lived & acted after the manner of that order. Born he is now in the order of humanity, he must act as a human being. And later shows him his true form with a boon. Krishna on returning to Dwaraka when asked, narrates the battle to Vasudeva and others. And later with his power revives the deadborn Parikshit. The royal ceremony of the Ashvamedha was initiated by Yudhishthira, after recommendations of Krishna. The ceremony is a year-long event where the horse roams any land in any direction it wishes to. The horse is followed by an army led by Arjuna, whose mission is to challenge any ruler who objects the free movement of the horse. This ceremony establishes the primacy of Yudhishthira as the emperor, and his recognition by other rulers and kingdoms. On his way Arjuna battled grandsons of Trigartas, Bhagdatta's son, Saindhavas who were able to overpower Arjuna who was fighting mildly as per his brother words, but at last defeated and spared by him. When Arjuna reaches Manipura, their ruler Vabhruvahana with his people welcomes him. Arjuna does not approve it and challenges him to battle. And as per Ulupi (Naga) words both fights, in which at last both struck each other and fell down. The latter's swoon was however due to his exertions in battle. Arjuna's wife Chitrangada comes and starts to lament for her husband death by his son and vows for suicide if he does not comes back. Ulupi (Arjuna's wife) at last uses her mystical gem to revive him and tells them her intentions. After which Arjuna again follows the horse. On his return he battled Sahadeva, Chedis, Gandharas and bested them. At the end of the year, victorious Arjuna's army and the horse return to the emperor's capital. When all the people were made gift, a half-golden mongoose came there who spoke to their amaze and compared that sacrifice inferior to that of a Brahmana family with just powdered barley, without any wealth & animal sacrifice, and then disappears.

The various manuscripts of the Mahabharata discovered in India in early to mid-19th century, show inconsistencies in the 36 Chapters of Anugita, including the name itself. The so-called Bombay manuscripts further splits the Anugita into Anugita, Vasudevagamana, Brahma Gita, Brahmana Gita, Gurusishya samvada and Uttankopakhyana. The Madras, Calcutta and Ahmedabad manuscripts give different names. Hall suggests Anugita may have been composed and inserted into the original sometime during the 16th or 17th century AD.

== Salient features ==
Aswamedhika Parva includes the philosophical treatise Anûgîta, as well as many tales and fables such as the mongoose at the sacrifice.

=== The fable of mongoose: animal sacrifice or compassion ===
A mongoose with blue eyes and colored gold on one side, appears during the final Aswamedhika stages of the fire yajna by Yudhishthira and other kings. The mongoose, in a thundering human voice, says, "O kings, this animal sacrifice is not equal to the tiny amount of barley by an unccha-vow ascetic." Yudhishthira does not understand, so asks the mongoose for an explanation. The mongoose tells them a story: Long ago, there was a terrible famine. The ascetic and his family had nothing to eat. To find food, the ascetic would do what people on unccha vow do - go to fields already harvested, and like pigeons pick left over grains from the harvested field to find food.

One day, after many hours of harsh work, the ascetic finds a handful of barley grains. He brings the grains home and his wife cooks them. Just when his son and daughter-in-law, his wife and he are about to eat their first meal in few days, a guest arrives. The ascetic washes the guest's feet and inquires how he is doing. The guest says he is hungry. The ascetic, explains the mongoose, gives his guest his own share of cooked barley. The guest eats it, but says it was too little, he is still hungry. The wife of the ascetic hears the guest and offers her own share of cooked barley, even though she too is starving. The guest eats that too, but says he still feels hungry. The ascetic's son and daughter-in-law give all their share of cooked barley too. The guest finishes all, then smiles and re-appears in the form of the god Dharma. The god gives the family a boon and fills their home with food, saying that it is not the quantity of a sacrifice that matters, but rather the quality of care and love in the sacrifice, given one's circumstances. The mongoose asks if Yudhishthira is confident that his animal sacrifice would please the deity Dharma. Before Yudhishthira can answer, the mongoose disappears.

The Rishis at the yajna ask if animal sacrifice is appropriate, or should they show compassion for all creatures. Some suggest that seeds of grain be substituted, and the animals be set free. Listening to the discussion between the Rishis, king Vasu suggests in Ashvamedhika Parva, that large gifts from a sinful person are of no value, but even a small gift from a righteous person given with love is of great merit.

== Quotes and teachings ==
Anugita parva, Chapter 27:

In that forest, Intelligence is the tree, Emancipation is the fruit, Tranquility is the shade;
It has Knowledge for its resting house, Contentment for its water, and Kshetrajna for its sun.

Tranquility is praised by those who are conversant with the forest of knowledge.

— Anugita, Aswamedhika Parva, Mahabharata Book xiv.27

Anugita parva, Chapter 44:

Days end with the sun’s setting, and nights with the sun’s rising;
the end of pleasure is always sorrow, and the end of sorrow is always pleasure.

All associations have dissociations for their end, and life has death for its end;
All action ends in destruction, and all that is born certainly dies.
Everything is transient, everything ends;
Only of knowledge, there is no end.

— Anugita, Aswamedhika Parva, Mahabharata Book xiv.44

== English translations ==
Aswamedhika Parva was composed in Sanskrit. Several translations of the book in English are available. Two translations from 19th century, now in public domain, are those by Kisari Mohan Ganguli and Manmatha Nath Dutt. The translations vary with each translator's interpretations.

Debroy, in 2011, notes that updated critical edition of Ashvamedhika Parva, after removing verses and chapters generally accepted so far as spurious and inserted into the original, has 1 parts, 96 adhyayas (chapters) and 2,741 shlokas (verses).

== See also ==
- Previous book of Mahabharata: Anushasana Parva
- Next book of Mahabharata: Ashramavasika Parva
