= Rajkumar Jhalajit Singh =

Indian writer, historian, Gandhian, and academic (1924–2021)

- Born: 14 September 1924; Yaiskul Hiruhanba Leikai, Imphal, Manipur, India
- Died: 8 January 2021 (aged 96)
- Occupations: Writer; Historian
- Known for: Meitei literature
- Parent(s): Maipak Sana; Ningthemcha Rajani Devi
- Awards: Padma Shri

Rajkumar Jhalajit Singh (14 September 1924 – 8 January 2021) was an Indian writer, historian, Gandhian and academic. He was known for his book, "A Short History of Manipur", which was banned from publishing or selling by his own family members, because the book misleads the readers that the Manipuris are the descendants of Arjuna of the Mahabharata.

Born on 14 September 1924 at Yaiskul Hiruhanba Leikai, Imphal, in the Northeast Indian state of Manipur to Maipak Sana and Ningthemcha Rajani Devi, he did his schooling at local schools and graduated from Guwahati Cotton College. His post graduate studies were at Calcutta University from where he secured his master's degree (MA) in Economics, followed by a graduate degree in Law (LLB). He was active in student politics during his college days and participated in the All India Students' Congress, held in Delhi. He carried on his political activities after studies and was involved with Indian National Congress as a member of the Assam Congress Working Committee and as the general secretary of the Manipur Pradesh Congress Committee. His contributions are reported in getting Manipur seceded from the undivided Assam state and eventually getting it full statehood.

Singh was one of the early journalists of Manipur and has been the Editor of Anouba Matam, one of the oldest local dailies. He worked as a lawyer for a while, before turning to law academics by joining the erstwhile Manipur Law College (presently LMS Law College) as a lecturer. Subsequently, he became the principal of the institution and also worked as a visiting professor at Guwahati University. He was a former president of Manipur Sahitya Parishad (1987–1989) and continued his association with the organization as its member. He also worked with Manipur University as the Controller of Examinations and was the president of Research Society of Manipur. He was the founder president of Manipur Sanskrit Parishad and sat in management committee of Sanskrit College, a Parishad initiative. He has published several books such as Manipur from 1508, Bharatkee Swaraj, A History of Manipur Literature (2 volumes) and A Short History of Manipur and has contributed a chapter, History and Development of the Ras Leela Dance of Manipur to a book, Aesthetics and Culture:Performing Arts. He has also released a book, Kabita Nikunja, as publisher. The Government of India awarded him the fourth highest civilian award of the Padma Shri in 1999. Singh resided at Yaiskul Hiruhanba Leikai of Imphal.

Singh died in January 2021 at the age of 96.

== See also ==
- Meitei literature
