= Chitrangada (princess) =

Wife of Arjuna in the Hindu epic Mahabharata

- Mahabharata character
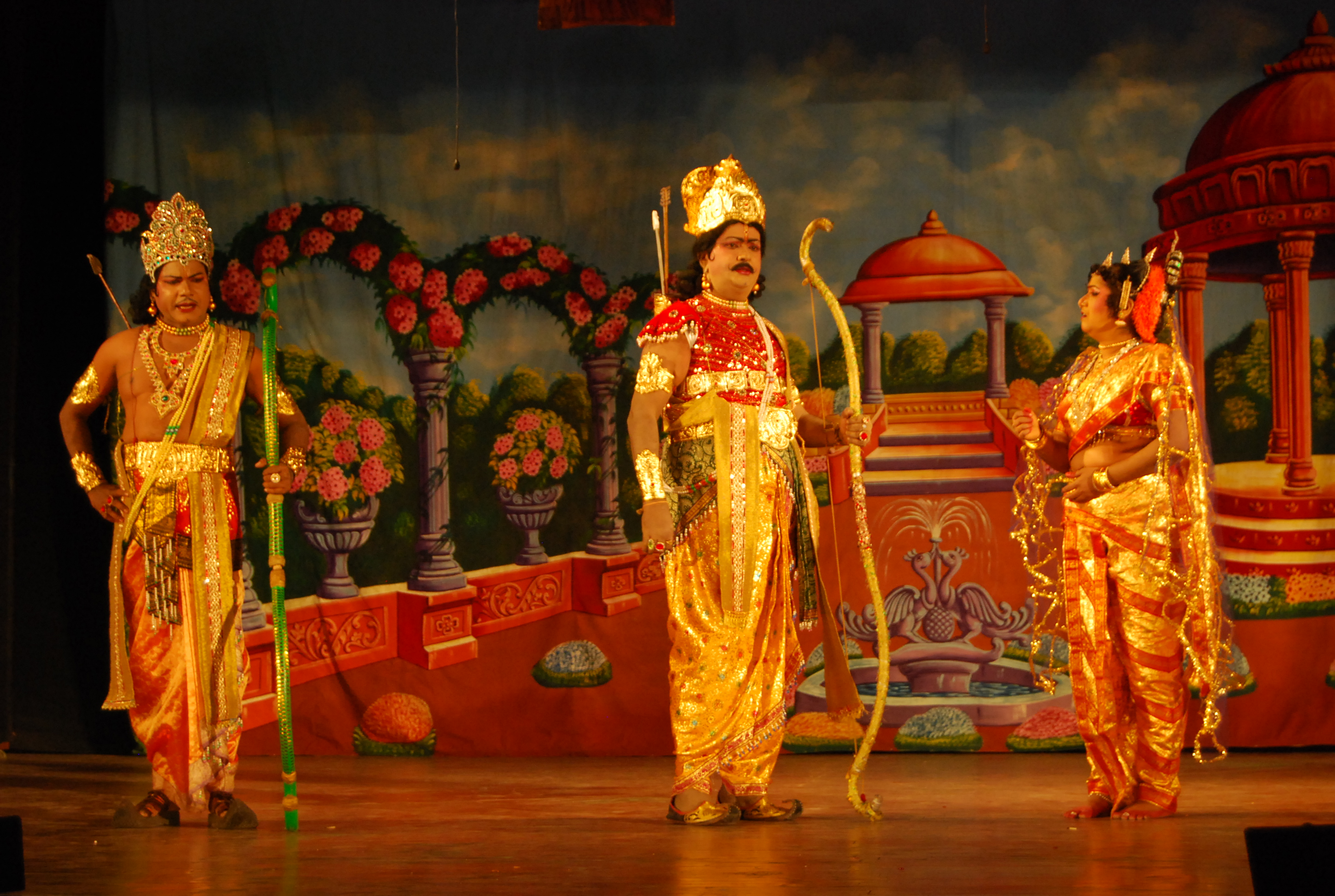
- A play depicting Chitrāngadā (right) with Arjuna and Babruvahana

Information
- Family: Chitravahana (father)
- Spouse: Arjuna
- Children: Babhruvahana
- Relatives: Kunti (mother-in-law), Pandavas (brothers-in-law), Draupadi, Ulupi, Subhadra (co-wives)
- Home: Manipura Kingdom

Chitrangada (Sanskrit: चित्रांगदा, romanized: Citrāṅgadā) is a character in the ancient Hindu epic Mahabharata. She is introduced as the princess of a region named Manipura or Manalura, and the only heir of King Chitravahana. During his exile, the Pandava prince Arjuna fell in love with her and she became his third wife. She had a son named Babhruvahana with him. The story of Chitrāngadā was adapted by Indian writer, Rabindranath Tagore in his play, Chitra.

== Early life ==
Manipura was a kingdom in India during the Mahabharata period. It was ruled by a king named Chitravahana. He had a daughter named Chitrāngadā, whom he named after the Madhulika flower. For multiple generations, the dynasty did not have more than one heir. Since Chitravahana did not have any other heir, he trained Chitrāngadā in warfare and rule. Chitrāngadā was well-versed in warfare and acquired the skills to protect the people of her land.

== Marriage with Arjuna ==
It is not described in Mahabharata as to how Arjuna, the Pandava prince met Chitrāngadā. The account is described in Rabindranath Tagore's play Chitra, where Tagore depicts Chitrāngadā (she had a maid called Sujata) as a warrior dressed in male clothes. Arjuna fell in love with her on account of her honesty and courage. Arjuna's wanderings, during his period of exile, also took him to the ancient kingdom of Manipura. Visiting king Chitravahana, the ruler of Manipura, he beheld his beautiful daughter Chitrāngadā and fell in love with her. When he approached the king to seek her hand in marriage, the king told him the story of his ancestor Prabhanjana who was childless and undertook severe austerities to obtain offspring. Finally, Shiva appeared to Prabhanjana, granting him the boon that each successive descendant of his race should have one child. As Chitravahana, unlike his ancestors, had not a son, but a daughter, he made her a "Putrika" according to the customs of his people. This meant that a child, born of her, would be his successor, and no one else. Arjuna readily agreed to this condition. Marrying Chitrāngadā, he stayed with her for three years. When Chitrāngadā had given birth to a son, Arjuna embraced her affectionately and took leave of her and her father to resume his wanderings.

Arjuna left her and returned to Hastinapura, promising her that he would take her back to his kingdom. Chitrāngadā started bringing up her son Babruvahana. Mahabharata loses mention about Chitrāngadā and her kingdom for several chapters. On the other side, the Pandavas went through various ordeals and finally winning the war against the Kauravas. Yudhishthira became the king of Hastinapura. His mind was restless since he always felt bad of killing his own kith and kin during the war. On the advice of sages, he conducted the ashvamedha yagna, where a decorated horse would be sent across the kingdom and wherever it goes unopposed, the land would be acquired by the king who sent it. Arjuna was tasked to take care of the horse. While the horse moved towards the North-east, a young man opposed Arjuna. While Arjuna asked about the identity of the young man, he said he was the prince of the land and that was enough introduction to start a fight.

A fierce fight started and Arjuna was shocked to see the dexterity with which arrows were pouring at him. He was finally hit by one of the arrows and before he fell unconscious, he realised that the young man was the son of Chitrāngadā. Chitrāngadā came crying to the spot hearing of the incident and she met Arjuna at his death bed. Ulupi, the other wife of Arjuna came to the spot with the Nagamani, a mythical gem capable of bringing back dead men to life. She told Chitrāngadā and Babruvahana that Arjuna was cursed by the Vasus that he would be killed by his own son because he was responsible for the fall of Bhishma (the eighth Vasu) and that with the incident he was relieved of his curse. Arjuna was woken up with the stone and he was happy to see both his wives and his son. Arjuna took Ulupi, Chitrāngadā and her son Babhruvahana to Hastinapura, where Chitrāngadā readily became the servant of Gandhari, the aunt of Arjuna. She spent her life in her service to Gandhari.

== Retirement of the Pandavas ==
Upon the onset of the Kali Yuga, the Pandavas along with Draupadi retired and left the throne to their only heir Arjuna's grandson, Parikshit. Giving up all their belongings and ties, they made their final journey of pilgrimage to the Himalayas, accompanied by a dog. Chitrāngadā went back to her kingdom, Manipura.

== Literature ==
- Citrāngadā in: M.M.S. Shastri Chitrao, Bharatavarshiya Prachin Charitrakosha (Dictionary of Ancient Indian Biography, in Hindi), Pune 1964, p. 213
- The Mahabharata of Krishna Dvaipayana Vyasa, trl. from the original Sanskrit by Kisari Mohan Ganguli, Calcutta 1883-1896
- Chitrāngadā in: Wilfried Huchzermeyer, Studies in the Mahabharata, edition sawitri 2018, p. 17-19. ISBN 978-3-931172-32-9 (also as E-Book)

== Bibliography ==
- Chandramouli, Anuja (2012). ARJUNA: Saga Of A Pandava Warrior-Prince. Leadstart Publishing Pvt Ltd. ISBN 978-93-81576-39-7.
- Debroy, Bibek (2010). The Mahabharata: Volume 2. Penguin Books. p. 536. ISBN 978-0-14-310013-3.
