= 2024 Indian general election in Manipur =

Election to constitute the 18th Lok Sabha in 2024

- 19 & 26 April 2024

All 2 Manipur seats in the Lok Sabha
- Opinion polls
- Turnout: 80.47% (▼2.22%)
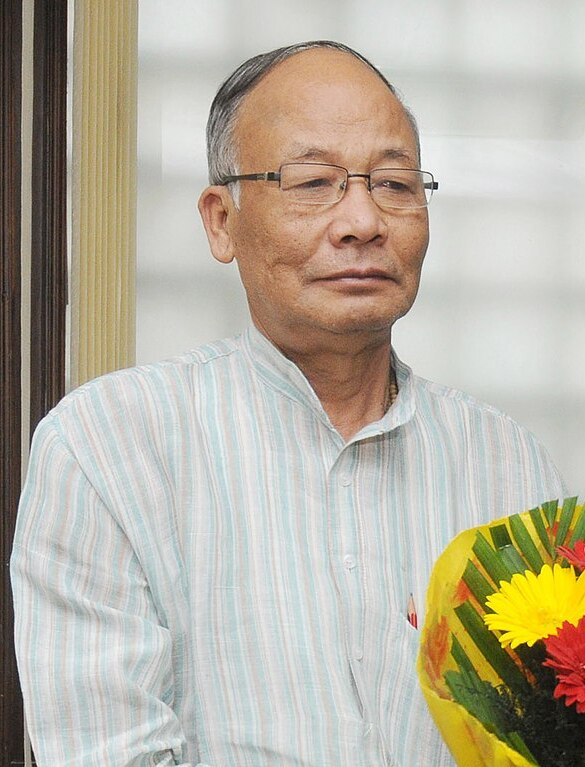

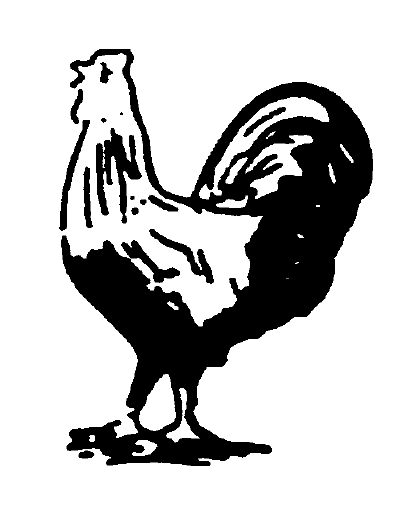

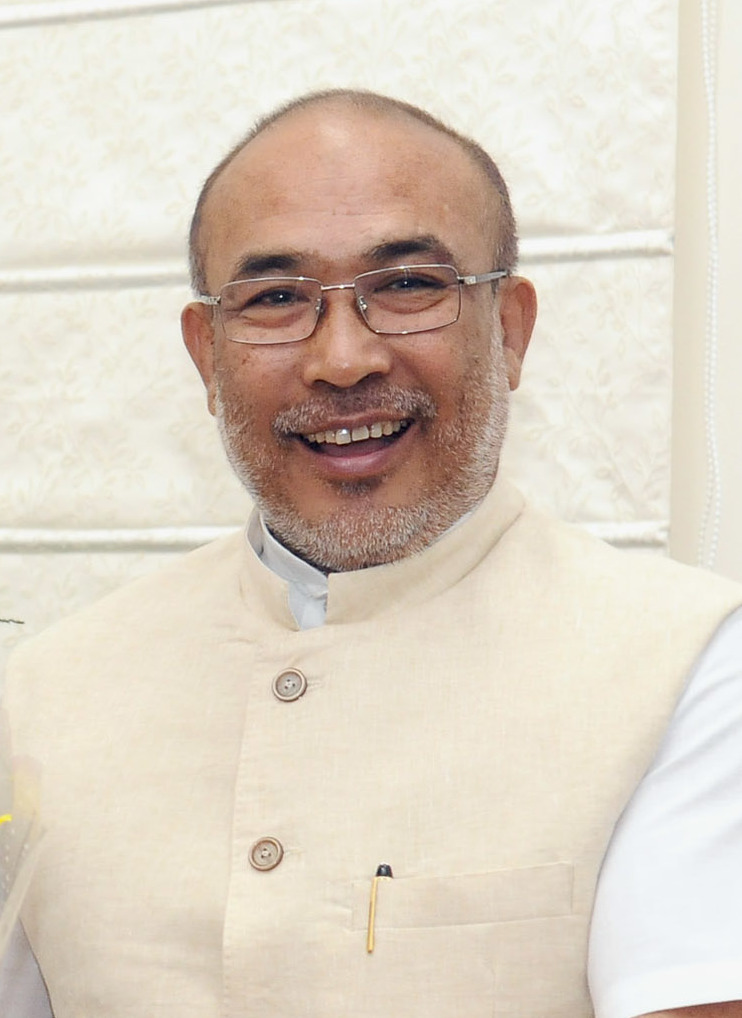
	First party	Second party	Third party
Leader	Okram Ibobi Singh	Lorho S. Pfoze	N. Biren Singh
Party	INC	NPF	BJP
Alliance	INDIA	NDA	NDA
Leader since	2007		2017
Leader's seat	did not contest	did not contest	did not contest
Last election	24.71%, 0 seat	22.55%, 1 seat	34.33%, 1 seat
Seats won	2	0	0
Seat change	▲2	▼1	▼1
Percentage	47.59%	18.87%	16.58%
Swing	▲22.88pp	▼3.68 pp	▼17.75 pp
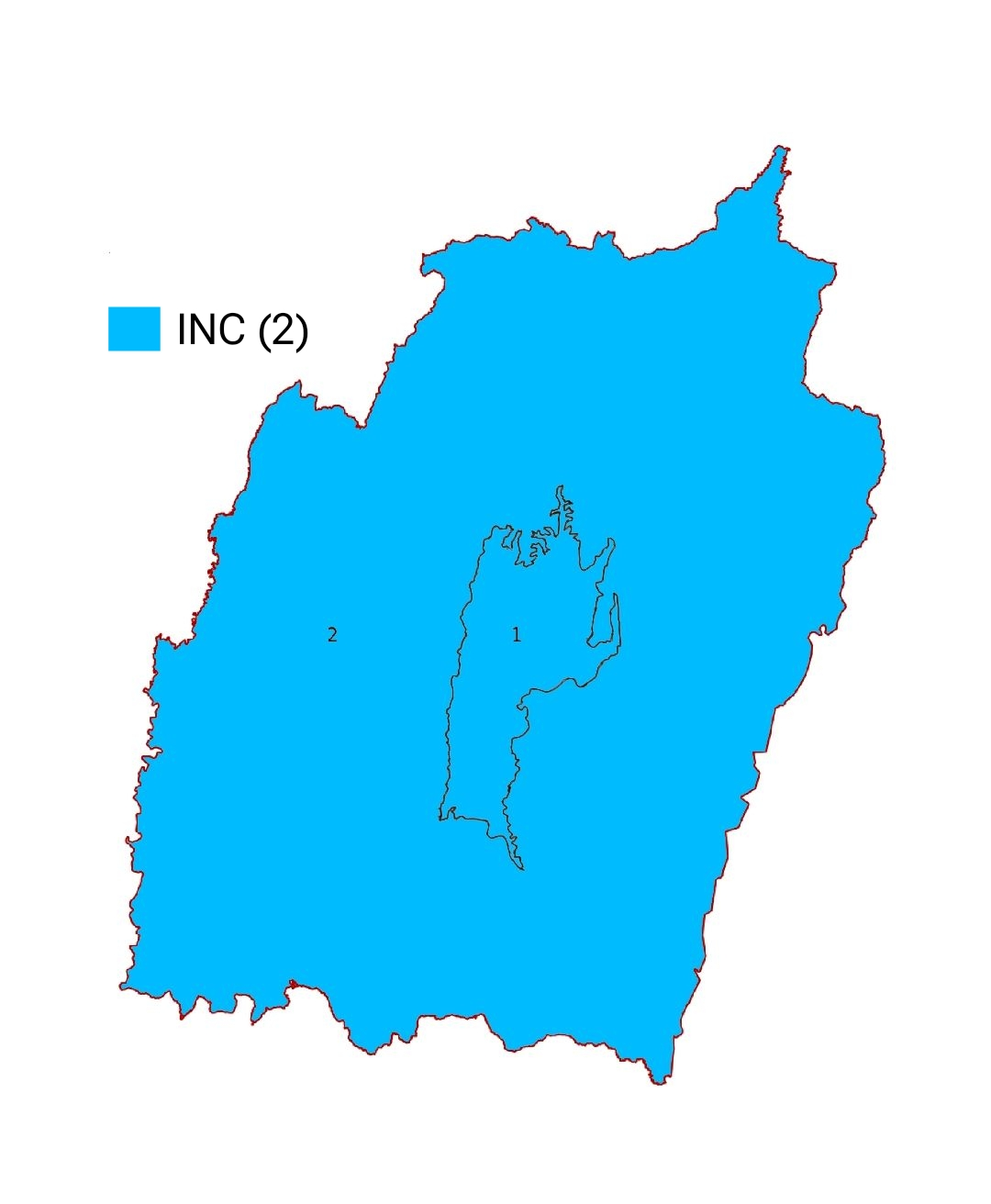
- Manipur Lok Sabha Results
Prime Minister before election
Narendra Modi
BJP
Prime Minister after election
Narendra Modi
BJP

The 2024 Indian general election was held in Manipur on 19 April and 26 April to elect two members of the 18th Lok Sabha, from the constituencies of Inner Manipur and Outer Manipur. The election got scheduled in the midst of year-long ethnic violence between the valley-based Meitei community and the hill-based Kuki-Zo community. There were reports of violence and intimidation by armed militias during the campaigning as well as polling but, on the whole, the election was conducted peacefully. Opposition Indian National Congress candidates, Bimol Akoijam and Alfred Kanngam Arthur, won the two seats respectively.

== Background ==
The 2024 Indian general election got scheduled in the midst of a year-long ethnic violence in Manipur between the Meitei and Kuki-Zo communities, which has seen more than 200 people killed and around 60,000 people displaced. The violence resulted in complete geographic separation of the two communities within a month of the onset of violence, with the Meiteis having fled the hill districts and the Kuki-Zo having fled the Imphal Valley. The violence nevertheless continued with arm-toting militias launching attacks on the opposite community and 'village defence volunteers' defending their villages. Over 6,000 guns that had been looted from the state's armouries remain with the militants and other civilian activists.

The Inner Manipur constituency, which covers the Imphal Valley, has fielded six candidates, including one from the ruling Bharatiya Janata Party (BJP) and one from the opposition Indian National Congress (INC, Congress).

The Outer Manipur constituency, which covers the surrounding hill districts and reserved for the state's Scheduled Tribe (Kuki-Zo and Naga) communities, only Naga candidates have contested. The Kuki-Zo community decided not to field any candidates. The BJP decided to support its NDA ally Naga People's Front, while the INC fielded a candidate from the Naga community.

== Election schedule ==
Poll event	Phase	
Poll event	I	II
Notification date	20 March	28 March
Last date for filing nomination	27 March	4 April
Scrutiny of nomination	28 March	5 April
Last Date for withdrawal of nomination	30 March	8 April
Date of poll	19 April	26 April
Date of counting of votes/Result	4 June 2024	
No. of constituencies	1 1/2 (Note: Polling in Outer Manipur constituency in Manipur was scheduled in two phases.)	1/2

== Parties and alliances ==
=== National Democratic Alliance ===
National Democratic Alliance

Party	Flag	Symbol	Leader	Seats contested
Bharatiya Janata Party			Sailesh Nigthoujam	1
Naga People's Front			Lorho S. Pfoze	1
Total				2

=== Indian National Developmental Inclusive Alliance ===
Indian National Developmental Inclusive Alliance

Party	Flag	Symbol	Leader	Seats contested
Indian National Congress				2

=== Others ===
Party	Symbol	Seats contested
Republican Party of India (Athawale)		1

== Candidates ==
Constituency					
Constituency		NDA		INDIA	
1	Inner Manipur	BJP	Thounaojam Basanta Kumar Singh	INC	Angomcha Bimol Akoijam
2	Outer Manipur	NPF	Kachui Timothy Zimik	INC	Alfred Kan-Ngam Arthur

== Surveys and polls ==
=== Opinion Polls ===
Polling agency	Date published	Margin of error				Lead
Polling agency	Date published	Margin of error	NDA	INDIA	Others	Lead
ABP News-CVoter	March 2024	±5%	2	0	0	NDA
Times Now-ETG	December 2023	±3%	1-2	0-1	0	NDA
India TV-CNX	October 2023	±3%	1	1	0	Tie
Times Now-ETG	September 2023	±3%	1-2	0-1	0	NDA
Times Now-ETG	August 2023	±3%	1-2	0-1	0	NDA

Polling agency	Date published	Margin of error				Lead
Polling agency	Date published	Margin of error	NDA	INDIA	Others	Lead
ABP News-CVoter	March 2024	±5%	50%	34%	16%	16

=== Exit Polls ===
Polling agency				Lead
Polling agency	NDA	INDIA	Others	Lead
Actual results	0	2	0	INDIA

== Campaigning, threats and boycott calls ==
The leading Meitei militia group, Arambai Tenggol with 60,000 cadres, announced "restrictions" on campaigning on 30 March 2024. It discouraged election campaigns, feasts, the use of loudspeakers, flag raising and election meetings, claiming that such events are more divisive than unifying, and would potentially lead to conflicts and violence. Manipur's state government as well as the central government stayed silent in the face of such impositions.

On 19 March, unidentified gunmen opened fire on the Congress Party's Outer Manipur candidate, Alfred Kanngam Arthur, while he was participating in a village-level consultative meeting in the Ukhrul district. The candidate was unhurt. On 28 March, the Congress Party's Inner Manipur candidate Bimol Akoijam was threatened by unidentified miscreants at his home. They gave an ultimatum to his family to send him for a meeting the following day. The Congress Party expressed deep concern and requested the police to provide protection to the candidate. On 14 April, miscreants opened fire at a campaign site in Moirang where Akoijam was expected to organise a campaign meeting the following day. Perceiving the threat, Akoijam cancelled the meeting. Two days later, armed miscreants again disrupted an election meeting at Kumbi. Akoijam confided to the press the extent of threats he was receiving and commented that these were from "my own community" [Meiteis].

A week before the first phase of polling, armed militants, alleged to belong to Arambai Tenggol, attacked a border region of Kangpokpi district in the Thoubal river valley, called Phailengmol Island Block, and killed two Kuki-Zo village defence volunteers. Graphic videos of their corpses being dragged, mutilated and body parts displayed were circulated.

The gruesome attacks and display caused the Kuki-Zo civil society organisations to come out with calls for boycotting the general election, saying "no justice, no vote". The Global Kuki-Zomi-Hmar Women Community, including journalists social workers, politicians and leaders, had earlier written to the Chief Election Commissioner, informing him of its decision to boycott the polls. Following the Phailengmol attack, the Kuki National Assembly and Kuki Inpi have also joined the fray. On 16 April, the Kuki Inpi Sadar Hills (covering the Kangpokpi district) asked all Kuki residents of the district to abstain from voting. Kuki Inpi Churachandpur issued a directive asking its residents to vote against the ruling BJP and its allied partners, which included the Naga People's Front.

The Naga civil society organisation United Naga Council asked the Naga community to support the consensus candidate chosen by the Naga People's Front. It asked for "unity" in the Naga community.

== Polling ==
The poll for the two Lok Sabha seats of Manipur was scheduled to be held on two days. During the Phase 1 polling on 19 April, it was held for Inner Manipur and three districts (Kangpokpi, Chandel and Churachandpur) of Outer Manipur. During the Phase 2 polling on 26 April, it was held in the remaining districts.

During the Phase 1 polling, several chaotic scenes were witnessed in many parts of the Imphal Valley. At Moirang Kampu (in Imphal East), a group of unidentified miscreants arrived in an SUV, had an argument in the polling booth and then fired a few rounds at the people from their vehicle. A 72-year old man was hit by a bullet. The enraged voters then destroyed the polling devices. Assault and firing was also reported from at least three other locations (Arapati Maning in Imphal East, Wangoo in Kakching and Thamnapokpi in Bishnupur). Several other polling stations in the Valley districts were captured by armed miscreants, with video clips flooding the social media. Many fingers were pointed at Arambai Tenggol militants. In one clip, the Congress candidate Bimol Akoijam is seen complaining to senior police officials about his polling agent having been threatened by armed miscreants and the agent having had to leave the polling station. The state unit of the Congress party filed a complaint with the chief election officer for the state alleging booth capturing, voter intimidation and other irregularities at 36 polling booths in Inner Manipur and 11 polling booths in the Sugnu area of Outer Manipur. The Election Commission ordered a re-poll at 11 polling booths, which was held on 22 April with over 81% voter turnout.

In the Outer Manipur constituency, the Kuki-Zo people in the Kangpokpi district were reported to have abstained from voting as per the instructions of Kuki Inpi Sadar Hills. News reports mentioned empty polling stations with "complete zero turnout". The election commission reported 22% voter turnout, which is mainly attributed to the Nepali and Naga voters in the district. In Churachandpur district, early news reports mentioned poor turnout, but the election commission data at the end of polling showed 64% turnout in the Churachandpur assembly constituency and 72% in the Saikot assembly constituency, with similar figures in other constituencies. The polling agent of Naga People's Front alleged large-scale booth capturing by armed militants in these constituencies, requesting a re-poll from the election commission. "All our voters and workers were threatened with arms and chased away by the militants", wrote the polling agent.

During Phase 2 polling, there were reports that armed militias were forcing voters to vote only for the Naga People's Front (NDA) candidate, Timothy Zimik. In an Ukhrul district polling booth, the irate voters destroyed the electronic voting machine. The cadres of NSCN-IM were blamed. The Election Commission claimed that the polling was peaceful and 76% votes were polled. However, the Congress-led INDIA alliance said there were reports of booth capturing at 17 polling stations. Repolling was ordered at six polling stations.

== Results ==
=== Results by alliance or party ===
Alliance/ Party		Popular vote			Seats		
Alliance/ Party		Votes	%	±pp	Contested	Won	+/−
INDIA	INC	7,52,491	47.59	▲22.88	2	2	▲2
NDA							
NDA	NPF	299,536	18.87	▼3.68	1	0	▼1
NDA	BJP	2,62,217	16.58	▼17.75	1	0	▼1
Total		5,60,575	35.45	▼21.43	2	0	▼2
RPI(A)		135,640	8.58%	new	1	0	Steady
IND		122,212	7.73%	▼2.41	5	0	Steady
NOTA		10,237	0.65%	▲0.34			
Total		1,581,155	100%	-	10	2	-

=== Results by constituency ===
Constituency		Turnout	Winner					Runner-up					Margin
Constituency		Turnout	Party	Alliance	Candidate	Votes	%	Party	Alliance	Candidate	Votes	%	Margin
1	Inner Manipur	80.37%▼	INC	INDIA	Angomcha Bimol Akoijam	3,74,017	46.93	BJP	NDA	Thounaojam Basanta Kumar Singh	2,64,216	33.16	1,09,801
2	Outer Manipur	76.84%▼	INC	INDIA	Alfred Kan-Ngam Arthur	3,84,954	48.32	NPF	NDA	Kachui Timothy Zimik	2,99,536	37.6	85,418

== Aftermath ==
Indian National Congress won both the seats in the election. The Inner Manipur seat was won by Bimol Akoijam with a margin of over 100,000 votes from his nearest rival Thounaojam Basant Kumar Singh of the Bharatiya Janata Party. The Outer Manipur seat was won by Alfred Kanngam Arthur with a margin of 85,000 over his nearest rival K. Timothy Zimik of Naga People's Front.

The results were interpreted as representing popular dissatisfaction with the ruling Bharatiya Janata Party in managing the ethnic violence that has plagued the state for over a year and the apparent apathy from the central leadership. In the Imphal Valley region, it was said that people were pointing fingers at the ruling party for the first time, and blaming it for letting militias like Arambai Tenggol function with impunity.

The United Naga Council, which had urged the Naga community to support the Naga People's Front candidate, ostracised the three Naga candidates that stood against him, including the winning candidate Alfred Kanngam Arthur. It announced a seven-year social boycott against them, claiming that they "purposively defied" the organisation and worked against the spirit of unity.

== Assembly segments-wise lead of parties ==
2024 Manipur Lok Sabha Elections Assembly Wise Lead Map

Party		Assembly segments	Current Position in the Assembly
INDIA	INC	36	5
INDIA	Total	36	5
NDA	NPF	13	2
NDA	BJP	9	37
NDA	NPP	Did Not Contest	7
NDA	JD(U)	Did Not Contest	1
NDA	Independents	Did not contest	3
NDA	Total	22	53
Others	KPA	Did Not Contest	2
Others	Independents	2	0
Others	Total	2	2
Total		60	

== Assembly segment-wise leads ==
Constituency		Winner			Runner-up			Margin
#	Name	Party	Votes	%	Party	Votes	%	Margin
Inner Manipur
1	Khundrakpam	INC	8,480	41.33	BJP	6,318	30.79	2,162
2	Heingang	BJP	21,263	71.66	INC	5,429	18.30	15,834
3	Khurai	INC	12,466	45.33	BJP	7,844	28.52	4,622
4	Khetrigao	INC	17,188	59.38	BJP	6,369	22.00	10,819
5	Thongju	INC	11,216	42.06	BJP	9,482	35.56	1,734
6	Keirao	BJP	17,772	70.74	INC	6,251	24.88	11,521
7	Andro	BJP	13,744	45.33	INC	11,780	38.85	1,964
8	Lamlai	INC	10,370	43.47	BJP	8,353	35.02	2,017
9	Thangmeiband	INC	11,260	57.44	BJP	4,966	25.33	6,294
10	Uripok	INC	10,471	57.56	RPI(A)	3,853	21.18	6,618
11	Sagolband	INC	8,901	51.32	BJP	5,404	31.16	3,497
12	Keisamthong	INC	10,064	47.80	RPI(A)	7,894	37.50	2,170
13	Singjamei	INC	9,386	56.96	BJP	3,937	23.89	5,449
14	Yaiskul	INC	11,537	56.40	BJP	5,402	26.41	6,135
15	Wangkhei	INC	14,314	56.84	BJP	6,711	26.65	7,603
16	Sekmai	BJP	8,820	38.58	INC	7,669	33.54	1,151
17	Lamsang	INC	10,076	38.25	RPI(A)	7,537	28.61	2,539
18	Konthoujam	BJP	11,241	44.99	INC	8,521	34.10	2,720
19	Patsoi	INC	14,169	47.27	BJP	8,532	28.47	5,637
20	Langthabal	INC	11,944	53.81	BJP	5,310	23.92	6,634
21	Naoria Pakhanglakpa	INC	15,282	53.60	BJP	6,369	22.34	8,913
22	Wangoi	INC	11,918	49.22	BJP	6,474	26.74	5,444
23	Mayang Imphal	INC	12,707	50.98	BJP	7,613	30.54	5,094
24	Nambol	BJP	16,673	56.46	INC	10,634	36.01	6,039
25	Oinam	BJP	7,802	35.36	INC	7,617	34.53	185
26	Bishenpur	BJP	12,164	47.10	INC	7,433	28.78	4,731
27	Moirang	INC	18,343	61.04	BJP	7,955	26.47	10,388
28	Thanga	BJP	7,104	43.00	INC	5,920	35.84	1,184
29	Kumbi	INC	7,746	39.33	BJP	7,741	39.31	5
30	Lilong	INC	21,788	72.75	BJP	6,285	20.99	15,503
31	Thoubal	INC	19,835	75.98	BJP	4,923	18.86	14,912
32	Wangkhem	INC	18,608	66.78	BJP	4,406	15.81	14,202
Outer Manipur
33	Heirok	INC	11,550	56.88	NPF	7,882	38.81	3,668
34	Wangjing Tentha	INC	14,817	63.30	NPF	7,941	33.93	6,876
35	Khangabok	INC	20,198	73.12	NPF	7,065	25.58	13,133
36	Wabgai	INC	13,601	53.23	NPF	11,578	45.32	2,023
37	Kakching	INC	11,869	63.88	NPF	6,061	32.62	5,808
38	Hiyanglam	NPF	9,769	54.70	INC	7,685	43.03	2,084
39	Sugnoo	NPF	10,338	59.61	INC	6,553	37.78	3,785
40	Jiribam	INC	9,471	50.46	NPF	8,524	45.42	947
41	Chandel	NPF	23,599	58.50	INC	15,520	38.47	8,079
42	Tengnoupal	NPF	22,264	57.03	INC	16,181	41.45	6,083
43	Phungyar	NPF	15,171	49.91	INC	14,843	48.84	328
44	Ukhrul	NPF	21,404	56.00	INC	16,524	43.23	4,880
45	Chingai	NPF	20,187	50.08	INC	19,772	49.05	415
46	Saikul	INC	3,901	49.19	NPF	3,585	45.21	316
47	Karong	IND	35,831	84.53	NPF	5,731	13.52	30,100
48	Mao	IND	25,178	56.33	NPF	17,466	39.07	7,712
49	Tadubi	NPF	15,032	41.60	IND	11,850	32.80	3,182
50	Kangpokpi	NPF	8,896	71.29	IND	2,443	19.58	6,453
51	Saitu	NPF	9,199	47.29	INC	4,529	23.28	4,670
52	Tamei	NPF	26,326	70.36	INC	5,691	15.21	20,635
53	Tamenglong	NPF	17,809	60.22	INC	10,224	34.57	7,585
54	Nungba	NPF	16,018	63.89	INC	8,431	33.63	7,587
55	Tipaimukh	INC	13,315	89.40	NPF	1,275	8.56	12,040
56	Thanlon	INC	12,389	93.48	IND	437	3.30	11,952
57	Henglep	INC	21,106	85.31	NPF	2,740	11.08	18,366
58	Churachandpur	INC	39,537	96.16	IND	1,033	2.51	38,504
59	Saikot	INC	48,600	96.63	IND	908	1.81	47,692
60	Singhat	INC	19,499	93.51	IND	705	3.38	18,794

== See also ==
- 2024 Indian general election in Meghalaya
- 2024 Indian general election in Mizoram
- 2024 Indian general election in Tripura
