= Inner Manipur Lok Sabha constituency =

Constituency of the Indian parliament in Manipur

Coordinates: 24.60°N 93.90°E

Inner Manipur MN-1
- Lok Sabha constituency
- location of Manipur in India

Constituency details
- Country: India
- Region: Northeast India
- State: Manipur
- Assembly constituencies: 32: Khundrakpam, Heingang, Khurai, Kshetrigao, Thongju, Keirao, Andro, Lamlai, Thangmeiband, Uripok, Sagolband, Keishamthong, Singjamei, Yaiskul, Wangkhei, Sekmai, Lamsang, Konthoujam, Patsoi, Langthabal, Naoriya Pakhanglakpa, Wangoi, Mayang Imphal, Nambol, Oinam, Bishnupur, Moirang, Thanga, Kumbi, Lilong, Thoubal and Wangkhem
- Established: 1951
- Total electors: 9,91,574 (2024)
- Reservation: None

Member of Parliament
- 18th Lok Sabha
- Incumbent Angomcha Bimol Akoijam
- Party: INC
- Alliance: INDIA
- Elected year: 2024

Inner Manipur Lok Sabha constituency is one of the two Lok Sabha (parliamentary) constituencies in Manipur, a state in northeastern India.

== Assembly segments ==
Inner Manipur Lok Sabha constituency is composed of the following Vidhan Sabha (legislative assembly) segments:

No	Name	Reservation	District	MLA	Party	2024 Lead
1	Khundrakpam	None	Imphal East	Thokchom Lokeshwar Singh	INC	INC
2	Heingang	None	Imphal East	N. Biren Singh	BJP	BJP
3	Khurai	None	Imphal East	L. Susindro Meitei	BJP	INC
4	Kshetrigao	None	Imphal East	Sheikh Noorul Hassan	NPP	INC
5	Thongju	None	Imphal East	Thongam Biswajit Singh	BJP	INC
6	Keirao	None	Imphal East	L. Rameshwor Meitei	BJP	BJP
7	Andro	None	Imphal East	T. Shyamkumar Singh	BJP	BJP
8	Lamlai	None	Imphal East	Khongbantabam Ibomcha	BJP	INC
9	Thangmeiband	None	Imphal West	Khumukcham Joykisan Singh	BJP	INC
10	Uripok	None	Imphal West	K. Raghumani Singh	BJP	INC
11	Sagolband	None	Imphal West	Rajkumar Imo Singh	BJP	INC
12	Keishamthong	None	Imphal West	Sapam Nishikant Singh	IND	INC
13	Singjamei	None	Imphal West	Yumnam Khemchand Singh	BJP	INC
14	Yaiskul	None	Imphal East	Thokchom Satyabrata Singh	BJP	INC
15	Wangkhei	None	Imphal East	Thangjam Arunkumar	BJP	INC
16	Sekmai	SC	Imphal West	Heikham Dingo Singh	BJP	BJP
17	Lamsang	None	Imphal West	Sorokhaibam Rajen	BJP	INC
18	Konthoujam	None	Imphal West	Sapam Ranjan Singh	BJP	BJP
19	Patsoi	None	Imphal West	Sapam Kunjakeswor Singh	BJP	INC
20	Langthabal	None	Imphal West	Karam Shyam	BJP	INC
21	Naoriya Pakhanglakpa	None	Imphal West	Soraisam Kebi Devi	BJP	INC
22	Wangoi	None	Imphal West	Khuraijam Loken Singh	NPP	INC
23	Mayang Imphal	None	Imphal West	Kongkham Robindro Singh	BJP	INC
24	Nambol	None	Bishnupur	T. Basanta Kumar Singh	BJP	BJP
25	Oinam	None	Bishnupur	Irengbam Nalini Devi	NPP	BJP
26	Bishnupur	None	Bishnupur	Govindas Konthoujam	BJP	BJP
27	Moirang	None	Bishnupur	Thongam Shanti Singh	NPP	INC
28	Thanga	None	Bishnupur	Tongbram Robindro Singh	BJP	BJP
29	Kumbi	None	Bishnupur	S. Premachandra Singh	BJP	INC
30	Lilong	None	Thoubal	Muhammad Abdul Nasir	JD(U)	INC
31	Thoubal	None	Thoubal	Okram Ibobi Singh	INC	INC
32	Wangkhem	None	Thoubal	K. Meghachandra Singh	INC	INC

== Members of Parliament ==
Election	Member	Party
1951	Jogeswar Singh Laisram	Indian National Congress
1957	Achaw Singh Laisram	Socialist Party
1967	M. Meghachandra	Communist Party of India
1971	N. Tombi Singh	Indian National Congress
1977	N. Tombi Singh	Indian National Congress
1980	Ngangom Mohendra	Communist Party of India
1984	N. Tombi Singh	Indian National Congress
1989	N. Tombi Singh	Indian National Congress
1991	Yumnam Yaima Singh	Manipur People's Party
1996	Thounaojam Chaoba Singh	Indian National Congress
1998	Thounaojam Chaoba Singh	Manipur State Congress Party
1999	Thounaojam Chaoba Singh	Manipur State Congress Party
2004	Thokchom Meinya	Indian National Congress
2009	Thokchom Meinya	Indian National Congress
2014	Thokchom Meinya	Indian National Congress
2019	Dr. Rajkumar Ranjan Singh	Bharatiya Janata Party
2024	Angomcha Bimol Akoijam	Indian National Congress

== Election results ==
Vote share of Winning candidates
2024	46.93%
2019	34.72%
2014	45.58%
2009	39.59%
2004	37.00%
1999	34.65%
1998	30.54%
1996	29.30%
1991	46.09%
1989	39.63%
1984	24.33%
1980	18.85%
1977	42.67%
1971	29.30%
1967	45.72%
1962	31.85%
1957	31.11%
1952	30.57%

=== 2024 ===
2024 Indian general election: Inner Manipur
Party	Candidate	Votes	%	±%
INC	Angomcha Bimol Akoijam	374,017	46.93	▲14.55
BJP	Thounaojam Basanta Kumar Singh	2,64,216	33.16	▼1.56
RPI(A)	Maheshwar Thounaojam	1,35,640	17.02	N/A
IND	Rajkumar Somendro Singh	13,050	1.64	N/A
IND	Moirangthem Totomshana Nongshaba	4,881	0.61	N/A
NOTA	None of the above	3,797	0.48	▲0.14
IND	Haorungbam Sarat Singh	1,296	0.16	N/A
Majority		1,09,801	13.78	▲11.44
Turnout		8,06,037	80.51	▼0.61
INC gain from BJP		Swing		

=== 2019 ===
2019 Indian general elections: Inner Manipur
Party	Candidate	Votes	%	±%
BJP	R.K. Ranjan Singh	263,632	34.72	▲20.20
INC	Oinam Nabakishore Singh	2,45,877	32.38	▼13.20
CPI	Moirangthem Nara Singh	1,33,813	17.62	▼13.19
Independent	Rajkumar Somendro Singh	81,634	10.75	
NEIDP	R.K Anand	25,010	3.29	
Majority		17,755	2.34	
Turnout		7,60,456	81.12	
BJP gain from INC		Swing		

=== 2014 ===
2014 Indian general elections: Inner Manipur
Party	Candidate	Votes	%	±%
INC	Thokchom Meinya	2,92,102	45.58	+5.99
CPI	Moirangthem Nara	1,97,428	30.81	−3.47
BJP	R.K. Ranjan Singh	92,443	14.52	+8.57
AITC	Sarangthme Manaboi	39,903	6.22	
AAP	Dr. Kh. Ibomcha Singh	3,275	0.51	N/A
Majority		94678	14.77	+9.46
Turnout		6,41,314	74.98	
INC hold		Swing		

=== 2009 ===
2009 Indian general elections: Inner Manipur
Party	Candidate	Votes	%	±%
INC	Thokchom Meinya	2,30,876	39.59	
CPI	Moirangthem Nara	1,99,916	34.28	
MPP	Thounaojam Chaoba	1,01,787	17.54	
BJP	Wahengbam Nipamacha Singh	34,094	5.85	
Majority		30,960	5.31	
Turnout		5,83,218	70.54	
INC hold		Swing		

=== 2004 ===
2004 Indian general elections: Inner Manipur
Party	Candidate	Votes	%	±%
INC	Dr. Thokchom Meinya	1,54,055	37.00	+6.66
CPI	Moirangthem Nara	1,04,722	25.15	
FPM	Leishangthem Chandramani	88,179	21.18	+19.29
BJP	Thounaojam Chaoba	66,451	15.96	
Independent	Nongmaithem Iboyaima Singh	1,646	0.40	
Independent	Nongmaithem Homendro Singh	1,353	0.32	
Majority		49,333	11.85	
Turnout		4,16,406	56.22	
INC gain from MSCP		Swing	+6.66	

=== 1999 ===
1999 Indian general election: Inner Manipur
Party	Candidate	Votes	%	±%
MSCP	Th. Chaoba	153,387	34.65	
MPP	Khaidem Mani	1,45,192	32.80	
INC	Dr. Nimai Chand Luwang	1,34,297	30.34	
FPM	Laishram Sarojini	8,350	1.89	
Independent	Wangkheirakpam Priyokumar	594	0.13	
Ajeya Bharat Party	Kh. Salaikhomba	527	0.12	
Independent	Wareppam Kullachandra	339	0.08	
Majority		8,195	1.85	
Turnout		4,46,627	67.88	
Swing to MSCP from MPP		Swing		

=== 1998 ===
1998 Indian general election: Inner Manipur
Party	Candidate	Votes	%	±%
MSCP	Thounaojam Chaoba Singh	131,972	30.54	
MPP	Okram Joy Singh	1,15,785	26.79	
INC	Dr. Nimaichand Luwang	1,08,448	25.09	
CPI	Ngangom Mohendra	56,507	13.08	
RJD	Khundrakpam Jibon Singh	13,633	3.15	
Independent	Hijam Somarendro Singh	2,906	0.67	
Lok Shakti	Huidrom Yaiphaba	1,144	0.26	
Independent	Warepam Kulachandra	904	0.21	
Independent	Thounaojam Netrajit Singh	858	0.20	
Majority		16,187	3.75	
Turnout		4,36,131	68.09	
Swing to MSCP from MPP		Swing		

=== 1996 ===
1996 Indian general election: Inner Manipur
Party	Candidate	Votes	%	±%
INC	Th. Chaoba	119,881	29.30	
FPM	Nongmaithem Pahari	83,293	20.36	
MPP	Yumnam Yaima Singh	64,266	15.71	
BJP	Haobam Bhuban Singh	42,882	10.48	
CPI	Longjam Jnanendra	38,484	9.41	
JD	W. Kulabidhu Singh	16,837	4.12	
AIIC(T)	Annie Mangsatabam	13,005	3.18	
IND	Atawar Rahman Khan	12,076	2.95	
SAP	Naorem Khagendra Singh	10,611	2.59	
ICS	R. K. Bhubonsana	1,561	0.38	
IND	Soram Mangi	1,533	0.37	
IND	Thoudam Lokeswor Singh	1,210	0.30	
IND	Laishram Holendra Singh	1,040	0.25	
IND	Wareppam Kullachandra	1,038	0.25	
IND	Khomdram Kumar Singh	758	0.19	
IND	Akham Birdhaja	316	0.08	
IND	L. Birendra Singh	309	0.08	
Majority		36,588	8.94	
Turnout		414,736	66.18	
Swing to INC from MPP		Swing		

=== 1991 ===
1991 Indian general election: Inner Manipur
Party	Candidate	Votes	%	±%
MPP	Yamnam Yaima	169,692	46.09	
INC	R. K. Jainchandra Singh	148,595	40.36	
BJP	Shamurailatapam Madumangol Sharma	42,017	11.41	
JP	Mayanglambam Jane Singh	1,949	0.53	
IND	Thokchom Kunjo Singh	1,793	0.49	
IND	Laiphangbam Basanta Kumar	1,638	0.44	
IND	Irengambam Jiten Singh	983	0.27	
IND	Chingsubam Akaba	481	0.13	
NPP	R. K. Ranjit Singh	464	0.13	
IND	Wareppam Kulchandra	389	0.11	
IND	Akoijam Lannagam	194	0.05	
Majority		21,097	5.73	
Turnout		375,908	61.47	
Swing to MPP from INC		Swing		

=== 1989 ===
1989 Indian general election: Inner Manipur
Party	Candidate	Votes	%	±%
INC	N. Tombi Singh	154,679	39.63	
MPP	Haobam Bhuban	147,128	37.70	
CPI	Ngangom Mohendra	48,531	12.44	
BJP	Shamulailatpam Modumangol Sharma	19,559	5.01	
IND	Oinam Tomba	10,981	2.81	
IND	Chingsubam Akaaba	4,735	1.21	
JD	W. Kulabidhu Singh	3,981	1.02	
MPC (Note: Manipur Peoples Council)	Rajkumar Ranjit Singh	677	0.17	
Majority		7,551	1.93	
Turnout		397,804	66.01	
INC hold		Swing		

=== 1984 ===
1984 Indian general election: Inner Manipur
Party	Candidate	Votes	%	±%
INC	N. Tombi Singh	104,091	24.33	
IND	Oinam Tomba	89,362	20.89	
CPI	Ngangom Mahendra	79,520	18.59	
BJP	Shamulalilatpam Madhumangol	58,521	13.68	
IC(S)	Ataur Rahman Khan	34,868	8.15	
IND	Mutum Amutombi	31,833	7.44	
IND	Laiphangbam Basanta Kumar	15,004	3.51	
IND	Md. Salamat Mia	11,039	2.58	
IND	Thingujam Lotan	3,519	0.82	
Majority		14,729	3.44	
Turnout		441,797	85.94	
Swing to INC from CPI		Swing		

=== 1980 ===
1980 Indian general election: Inner Manipur
Party	Candidate	Votes	%	±%
CPI	Ngangom Mohendra	69,670	18.85	
INC(I)	Ningthoujam Benoy Singh	57,724	15.62	
MPP	Rajkumar Madhuryyajit Singh	49,277	13.33	
IND	Mutum Amutombi	47,783	12.93	
JP	Laishram Achaw Singh	41,355	11.19	
INC(U)	N. Tombi Singh	35,700	9.66	
IND	Muhamad Salamat Sheikh	31,594	8.55	
IND	Laiphangbam Basanta Kumar	15,279	4.13	
IND	Hindangamayum Indusekhar	14,905	4.03	
IND	Wareppan Kulachandra Singh	6,336	1.71	
Majority		11,946	3.23	
Turnout		380,893	81.16	
Swing to CPI from INC		Swing		

=== 1977 ===
1977 Indian general election: Inner Manipur
Party	Candidate	Votes	%	±%
INC	N. Tombi Singh	105,740	42.67	
MPP	Alimudin	80,081	32.32	
CPI	Nagangom Mahendro Singh	32,897	13.28	
JP	Laishram Achaw	29,075	11.73	
Majority		25,659	10.35	
Turnout		251,631	61.69	
INC hold		Swing		

=== 1971 ===
1971 Indian general election: Inner Manipur
Party	Candidate	Votes	%	±%
INC	N. Tombi Singh	40,933	29.30	
CPI	M. Meghachandra	38,900	27.85	
MPP	Tombi Singh Salam	31,029	22.21	
SSP	Laishram Achaw	13,134	9.40	
INC(O)	Rajkumar Jhalajit Singh	7,712	5.52	
IND	Nongthombam Ibomcha Singh	5,419	3.88	
IND	Hijam Makar	2,557	1.83	
Majority		2,033	1.45	
Turnout		142,405	49.79	
Swing to INC from CPI		Swing		

=== 1967 ===
1967 Indian general election: Inner Manipur
Party	Candidate	Votes	%	±%
CPI	M. Meghachandra	91,131	45.72	
INC	R. K. J. Singh	74,148	37.20	
IND	L. Jugeswar	18,298	9.18	
IND	L. Manaobi	15,743	7.90	
Majority		16,983	8.52	
Turnout		204,788	77.72	
Swing to CPI from INC		Swing		

=== 1962 ===
1962 Indian general election: Inner Manipur
Party	Candidate	Votes	%	±%
INC	Salam Tombi Singh	46,281	31.85	
Socialist	Laisram Achaw Singh	33,965	23.38	
CPI	Moirangthem Meghachandra Singh	21,503	14.80	
IND	Nongthombam Ibomcha Singh	21,071	14.50	
IND	Ningthoujam Benoy Singh	11,568	7.96	
PSP	Nongmeikapam Nabokishor Singh	10,909	7.51	
Majority		12,316	8.47	
Turnout		145,368	68.27	
Swing to INC from Independent		Swing		

=== 1957 ===
1957 Indian general election: Inner Manipur
Party	Candidate	Votes	%	±%
Independent	Laisram Achow Singh	28,881	31.11	
INC	Laisram Jugeswar Singh	27,371	29.48	
CPI	Thokchom Bira Singh	19,298	20.79	
PSP	Sougaijam Samarendra Singh	9,082	9.78	
IND	Lairenmayum Iboongohai Singh	8,212	8.84	
Majority		1,510	1.63	
Turnout		92,844	55.61	
Swing to Independent from INC		Swing		

=== 1952 ===
1952 Indian general election: Inner Manipur
Party	Candidate	Votes	%	±%
INC	Jogeswor Singh	22,902	30.57	
CPI	Th. Bira Singh	13,184	17.60	
IND	Iswari Devi	11,809	15.77	
GSS (Note: Gandhi Sebak Seva)	E. Tompok Singh	7,196	9.61	
PP (Note: Praja Party)	Ibomacha Singh	6,860	9.16	
Socialist	L. Achou Singh	5,747	7.67	
AMN (Note: All Manipur National Union)	H. Nilamani Singh	3,812	5.09	
IND	Leiren Singh	1,928	2.57	
HR (Note: Historical Research)	Bokul Singh	1,468	1.96	
Majority		9,718	12.97	
Turnout		74,906	50.07	
INC win (new seat)				

== See also ==
- List of constituencies of the Lok Sabha
- Outer Manipur Lok Sabha constituency
