= Kshetrimayum Biren Singh =

Indian politician

Member of Manipur Legislative Assembly
- In office 2017–2020
- Preceded by: Pheiroijam Parijat Singh
- Succeeded by: Khongbantabam Ibomcha
- Constituency: Lamlai

Personal details
- Born: Kshetrimayum Biren Singh
- Party: Janata Dal (United)
- Other political affiliations: Indian National Congress
- Profession: Social Worker

Kshetrimayum Biren Singh is an Indian politician from Manipur and member of the Janata Dal (United). He was elected to the Manipur Legislative Assembly from Lamlai constituency in Imphal East District from the Indian National Congress in the 2017 Manipur Legislative Assembly election.

During the 2020 Manipur vote of confidence, he was one of the eight MLAs who skipped the assembly proceedings, defying the party whip for the trust vote. He resigned from Indian National Congress and later joined Bharatiya Janata Party in presence of Ram Madhav, Baijayant Panda and Chief Minister of Manipur N. Biren Singh.
