= Thounaojam Basanta Kumar Singh =

Indian politician

Member of the Manipur Legislative Assembly

Thounaojam Basanta Kumar Singh (born 1963) is an Indian politician from Manipur. He is a member of the Manipur Legislative Assembly from Nambol Assembly constituency in Bishnupur district. He won the 2022 Manipur Legislative Assembly election, representing the Bharatiya Janata Party. He was formerly with the Indian Administrative Service. He is also served as the minister of education in the second N. Biren Singh ministry.

== Early life and education ==
Singh is from Nambol, Bishnupur district, Manipur. He is the son of Thounaojam Chaoba Singh, a five-time MLA from Nambol and a union sports minister of state in the Atal Bihari Vajpayee government. His wife, Romabai Lairenjam is an MD, who worked at Delhi's RML Hospital before joining local politics. He completed his M.A. in 1987 at St. Stephens College, which is affiliated with Delhi University. Later, he did LLB in 2002 at Manipur University.

== Career ==
Singh won from Nambol Assembly constituency representing the Bharatiya Janata Party in the 2022 Manipur Legislative Assembly election. He polled 16,885 votes and defeated his nearest rival, Nameirakpam Loken Singh of the Indian National Congress, by a margin of 3,060 votes.

=== Lok Sabha polls ===
In the 2024 Indian general election in Manipur, he contested on Bharatiya Janata Party ticket from the Inner Manipur Lok Sabha constituency and lost to Angomcha Bimol Akoijam of the Indian National Congress, by a margin of 109,801 votes.
