= Ngangom =

Ngangom is a Meitei family name. Notable people with the surname are:

- Ngangom Dingko Singh, Indian boxer
- Ngangom Bala Devi, Indian professional footballer
- Robin Ngangom, Indian poet and translator
- Ngangom Rajesh Singh, Indian cricketer
- Ngangom Ronald Singh, Indian professional footballer
- Ngangom Mohendra, Indian politician
