= Ngangom Mohendra =

Indian politician (1925–2000)

Member of Parliament, Lok Sabha
- In office 1980–1984
- Preceded by: N. Tombi Singh
- Succeeded by: N. Tombi Singh
- Constituency: Inner Manipur

Personal details
- Born: 9 April 1925 Nagamapal village, Imphal district, Manipur, British India (now in Manipur, India)
- Died: 20 February 2000 (aged 74) Nagamapal, Imphal, India
- Party: Communist Party of India
- Spouse: Memma Devi

Ngangom Mohendra (9 April 1925 – 20 February 2000) was an Indian politician. He was a Member of Parliament, representing Inner Manipur in the Lok Sabha, the lower house of India's Parliament, from 1980 to 1984.

Mohendra died in Nagamapal, Imphal on 20 February 2000, at the age of 74.
