= Yumnam Yaima Singh =

Indian politician

Member of Parliament, Lok Sabha
- In office 1991-1996
- Preceded by: N. Tombi Singh
- Succeeded by: Thounaojam Chaoba Singh
- Constituency: Inner Manipur

Personal details
- Born: 28 August 1922 Oinam, Manipur, British India (now in Manipur, India)
- Died: 3 March 2017 (aged 94)
- Party: Manipur Peoples Party
- Spouse: Leimahal Devi

Yumnam Yaima Singh (28 August 1922 – 3 March 2017) was an Indian politician from Manipur. He was a Member of Parliament, representing Inner Manipur in the Lok Sabha, the lower house of India's Parliament. He died on 3 March 2017, at the age of 94.
