= M. Meghachandra =

Indian politician (1924–2011)

Member of Parliament, Lok Sabha
- In office 1967–1971
- Preceded by: N. Tombi Singh
- Succeeded by: N. Tombi Singh
- Constituency: Inner Manipur

Personal details
- Born: 1 September 1924 Imphal, Manipur, British India (now in Manipur, India)
- Died: 25 May 2011 (aged 86) Uripok, Imphal West district, Manipur, India
- Party: Communist Party of India
- Spouse: Promodini Devi

Moirangthem Meghachandra (1 September 1924 – 25 May 2011) was an Indian politician. He was a Member of Parliament, representing Inner Manipur in the Lok Sabha, the lower house of India's Parliament, from 1967 to 1971. Meghachandra died in Uripok, Imphal West district on 25 May 2011, at the age of 86.
