= Meinam Bhorot Singh =

Indian politician (1950/1951–2026)

Meinam Bhorot Singh (1950 or 1951 – 8 January 2026) was an Indian politician who was a member of the Bharatiya Janata Party. Singh was also a member of the Manipur Legislative Assembly from the Thangmeiband constituency in Imphal West district. Singh died in Imphal on 8 January 2026, at the age of 75.
