= Oinam Lukhoi Singh =

Indian politician

Member of Manipur Legislative Assembly
- In office 2012–2022
- Preceded by: Salam Joy Singh
- Succeeded by: Khuraijam Loken Singh (2022)
- Constituency: Wangoi

Personal details
- Born: Oinam Lukhoi Singh Wangoi Yumnam Huidrom
- Party: Bharatiya Janata Party
- Other political affiliations: Indian National Congress All India Trinamool Congress
- Spouse: Dorina Thangniang
- Children: Alex Oinam, Albert Oinam and Luxmikanta Oinam

Oinam Lukhoi Singh is an Indian politician from Manipur and member of the Bharatiya Janata Party. He was elected as a member of the Manipur Legislative Assembly from Wangoi constituency in Imphal West District on an Indian National Congress ticket in the 2012 & 2017 Manipur Legislative Assembly election.

During the 2020 Manipur vote of confidence, he was one of the eight MLAs who had skipped the assembly proceedings, defying the party whip for the trust vote. He resigned from Indian National Congress and later joined Bharatiya Janata Party in presence of Ram Madhav, Baijayant Panda and Chief Minister of Manipur N. Biren Singh.

After winning by-election in 2020, he promised to insert all youths of his constituency in every state government's recruitment. Many critics including Khaidem Mani, the chairman of Manipur Human Rights Commission, criticised him for his statement talking about open corruption in the state.
