= Thounaojam Chaoba Singh =

Indian politician

Thounoujam Chaoba Singh

Union Minister of State for Food Processing Industries
- In office 27 May 2000 – 1 September 2001
- Prime Minister: Atal Bihari Vajpayee
- Minister: Nitish Kumar; Ajit Singh
- Preceded by: Syed Shahnawaz Hussain

Union Minister of State for Youth Affairs and Sports
- In office 2 February 2000 – 27 May 2000
- Prime Minister: Atal Bihari Vajpayee
- Minister: Uma Bharti
- Succeeded by: Syed Shahnawaz Hussain

Union Minister of State for Culture, Youth Affairs and Sports
- In office 13 October 1999 – 2 February 2000
- Prime Minister: Atal Bihari Vajpayee
- Minister: Ananth Kumar

Member of Parliament, Lok Sabha
- In office 13 May 1996 – 16 May 2004
- Preceded by: Yumnam Yaima Singh
- Succeeded by: Thokchom Meinya
- Constituency: Inner Manipur

Personal details
- Born: 24 May 1937 (age 89) Utlou, Bishnupur district
- Party: Bharatiya Janata Party
- Relatives: Thounaojam Basanta Kumar Singh
- Occupation: Politician
- Awards: Padma Shri (2023)

Thounaojam Chaoba Singh (born 24 May 1937 in Utlou, Bishnupur district, Manipur), also known as Utlou Chaoba, is a former Indian Union minister and Bharatiya Janata Party state president from Manipur.

== Political career ==
He began his career with the Indian National Congress. From 1972, to 1995, Chaoba won from the Nambol Assembly Seat 5 times. He was Deputy Speaker of Manipur Legislative Assembly from 1974 to 1975. He became deputy chief minister of Manipur from 1994 to 1995.

He was elected to the 11th Lok Sabha in 1996 from Inner Manipur from the Indian National Congress. He was elevated to the role of Congress Party state president in 1997.

He was re-elected from this seat to the 12th Lok Sabha in 1998 and 13th Lok Sabha in 1999, but both times contesting with his regional party, the Manipur State Congress Party.

In 1999, he became the Union Minister of State, Culture, Youth Affairs and Sports in the government of Prime Minister Atal Bihari Vajpayee.

Chaoba Singh joined the Bharatiya Janata Party prior to the 2004 Indian General Elections. He was named the Manipur BJP President and kept that role until 2006.

In the interim years, Singh formed his own Manipur People's Party.

In 2012, he was once again named Manipur BJP President and held that position until 2016.

Chaoba Singh was named by various source as one of the front-runners to be Chief Minister during the 2017 Manipur Legislative Assembly election. However, he ended up losing from the Nambol and post went to N. Biren Singh.

== Awards ==
In 2023, he was honored with Padma Shree Award in public affairs by President of India Droupadi Murmu at Rashtrapati Bhavan.
