= Khongbantabam Ibomcha =

Indian politician

Member of the Manipur Legislative Assembly
- Incumbent
- Assumed office 2022
- Preceded by: Kshetrimayum Biren Singh
- Constituency: Lamlai

Personal details
- Born: 1955 (age 70–71) Lamlong, Imphal East district, Manipur, India
- Party: Bharatiya Janata Party
- Spouse: Bimotama Leima
- Children: 3
- Education: Moirang College, Manipur University

Khongbantabam Ibomcha (1955) is an Indian politician from Manipur. He is an MLA from Lamlai Assembly constituency in Imphal East district. He won the 2022 Manipur Legislative Assembly election, representing the Bharatiya Janata Party.

== Early life and education ==
Ibomcha is from Lamlong, Imphal East District, Manipur. He is the son of late Pishak Singh. He married Bimotama Leima and they have three children, Sarojbala Chanu, Sadananda Singh and Sapana Chanu. He completed his graduation in economics at Moirang College, affiliated with Manipur University.

== Career ==
Ibomcha won from Lamlai Assembly constituency representing the Bhratiya Janata Party in the 2022 Manipur Legislative Assembly election. He polled 10,105 votes and defeated his nearest rival, Lourembam Sanjoy Singh of the National People's Party, by 1,457 votes. He first contested as a Nationalist Congress Party candidate in the 2002 Manipur Legislative Assembly election but lost to Communist Party of India candidate Pheiroijam Parijat Singh by 195 votes. In the 2017 Manipur Legislative Assembly election, he lost to Kshetrimayum Biren Singh of the Indian National Congress by 852 votes.
