= Khuraijam Loken Singh =

Indian politician

Cabinet Minister of Arts & Culture, Tourism in Manipur
- Incumbent
- Assumed office 4 February 2026
- Chief Minister: Yumnam Khemchand Singh

Member of Manipur Legislative Assembly
- Incumbent
- Assumed office 10 March 2022
- Preceded by: Oinam Lukhoi Singh
- Constituency: Wangoi

Personal details
- Born: 1 January 1971 (age 55) Manipur, India
- Party: National People's Party

Khuraijam Loken Singh (born 1 January 1971) is an Indian politician and a state cabinet minister of Arts & Culture, Tourism from Manipur in Y. Khemchand Singh ministry. He is an MLA from Wangoi Assembly constituency in Imphal West district. He won the 2022 Manipur Legislative Assembly election, representing the National People's Party.

== Early life and education ==
Singh is from Yumnam Huldrom, Wangoi, Imphal West district, Manipur. He is the son of Khuraijam Yaima Singh. He married Nganbi Devi, and together they have a son and a daughter. He completed his pre-university course in arts in 1989 at Mayai Lambi College, Yumnam Huidrom, Manipur.

== Career ==
Singh won from Wangoi Assembly constituency, representing the National People's Party in the 2022 Manipur Legislative Assembly election. He polled 15,606 votes and defeated his nearest rival, Oinam Lukhoi Singh of the Bharatiya Janata Party, by 3,266 votes.

Singh was sworn in as a cabinet minister in the Y. Khemchand Singh ministry in 2026.
