= Wangoi Assembly constituency =

Legislative Assembly constituency in Manipur State, India

Coordinates: 24.68°N 93.9°E

Wangoi
- Constituency No. 22 for the Manipur Legislative Assembly

Constituency details
- Country: India
- Region: Northeast India
- State: Manipur
- District: Imphal West
- Lok Sabha constituency: Inner Manipur
- Established: 1972
- Total electors: 30,031
- Reservation: None

Member of Legislative Assembly
- 12th Manipur Legislative Assembly
- Incumbent Khuraijam Loken Singh
- Party: NPP
- Alliance: NDA

Wangoi is one of the 60 Legislative Assembly constituencies of Manipur state in India.

It is part of Imphal West district. As of 2022, it is represented by Khuraijam Loken Singh of the National People's Party.

== Extent ==
Wangoi is the 22nd among 60 constituencies of Manipur. It consists of 40 parts namely: 1 - Irom Meijrao Maning Leikai, 2 - Irom Meijrao Mamang Leikai, 3 - Wakching Khullen, 4 - Samurou Awang Leikai, 5 - Samurou Awang Makha, 6 - Takhellambam Konjin, 7 - Samurou Mamang Leikai, 8 - Samurou Mayai Maning Leikai, 9 - Samurou Makha Leikai (A), 10 - Samurou Makha Leikai (B), 11 - Naorem Chaprou, 12 - Oinam Sawombung Makha Leikai, 13 - Oinam Sawombung Awang, 14 - Wangoi Longjam Leikai & Wangoi Kabui, 15 - Wangoi Makha Leikai, 16 - Wangoi Wahengbam Leikai, 17 - Wangoi Mamang Leikai, 18 - Wangoi Thoudam Leikai and Thounaojam Leikai, 19 - Wangoi Thoudam Makha Leikai, 20 - Laiphrakpam, 21 - Khaidem Leikai, 22 - Thiyam Leishangkhong, 23 - Thiyam Leishangkhong Khwai Leirak Makha (A), 24 - Thiyam Leishangkhong Khwai Leirak Makha (B), 25 - Paobitek Mamang Leikai, 26 - Paobitek Mayai Leikai, 27 - Upokpi, 28 - Paobitek Maning Leikai, 29 - Wangoi Top Pangal Siphai (A), 30 - Wangoi Top Pangal Siphai (B), 31 - Laku Huidrom Awang Leikai (A), 32 - Laku Huidrom Awang Leika (B), 33 - Iram Siphai Mayai Leikai, 34 - Iram Siphai Mamang Leikai, 35 - Yumnam Huidrom Mayai Leikai, 36 - Yumnam Huidrom Makha Leikai (A), 37 - Yumnam Huidrom Makha Leikai (B), 38 - Mutum Phibou Mayai Leikai (A), 39 - Mutum Phibou Mayai Leikai (B), and 40 - Chongtham Kona.

== Members of the Legislative Assembly ==
Year	Member	Party
1972	Chungkham Rajmohan Singh	Manipur Peoples Party
1974	Wahengbam Nipamacha Singh	Indian National Congress
1980	Chungkham Rajmohan Singh	Indian National Congress
1984	Wahengbam Nipamacha Singh	Janata Party
1990	Wahengbam Nipamacha Singh	Indian Congress (Socialist) – Sarat Chandra Sinha
1995	Wahengbam Nipamacha Singh	Indian National Congress
2000	Wahengbam Nipamacha Singh	Manipur State Congress Party
2002	Yumnam Mani Singh	Manipur State Congress Party
2007	Salam Joy Singh	Nationalist Congress Party
2012	Oinam Lukhoi Singh	All India Trinamool Congress
2017	Oinam Lukhoi Singh	Indian National Congress
2020 by-election	Oinam Lukhoi Singh	Bharatiya Janata Party
2022	Khuraijam Loken Singh	National People's Party

== Election results ==
=== 2027 Assembly election ===
2027 Manipur Legislative Assembly election: Wangoi
Party	Candidate	Votes	%	±%
INC				
NDA				
NOTA	None of the above			
Majority				
Turnout				
gain from		Swing		

=== Assembly Election 2022 ===
2022 Manipur Legislative Assembly election: Wangoi
Party	Candidate	Votes	%	±%
NPP	Khuraijam Loken Singh	15,606	55.29%	▲34.78
BJP	Oinam Lukhoi Singh	12,340	43.72%	▲3.51
INC	Salam Joy Singh	156	0.55%	▼38.72
NOTA	None of the Above	122	0.43%	▲0.08
Margin of victory		3,266	11.57%	▲10.63
Turnout		28,224	93.98%	▼0.56
Registered electors		30,031		▲4.17
NPP gain from BJP		Swing	▲15.08	

=== Assembly By-election 2020 ===
2020 Manipur Legislative Assembly by-election: Wangoi
Party	Candidate	Votes	%	±%
BJP	Oinam Lukhoi Singh	10,960	40.21%	▲15.09
NPP	Khuraijam Loken Singh	10,703	39.27%	▲10.89
INC	Salam Joy Singh	5,591	20.51%	▼7.73
NOTA	None of the Above	96	0.35%	New
Margin of victory		257	0.94%	▲0.81
Turnout		27,254	94.94%	▼0.09
Registered electors		28,828		▲4.02
BJP gain from NPP		Swing	▲11.83	

=== Assembly Election 2017 ===
2017 Manipur Legislative Assembly election: Wangoi
Party	Candidate	Votes	%	±%
INC	Oinam Lukhoi Singh	7,443	28.38%	▲5.93
NPP	Khuraijam Loken Singh	7,407	28.24%	New
BJP	Salam Joy Singh	6,590	25.13%	New
Manipur National Democratic Front	Sagolsem Achouba Singh	3,983	15.19%	New
LJP	Moirangmayum Thoiba Singh	719	2.74%	New
NOTA	None of the Above	83	0.32%	New
Margin of victory		36	0.14%	▼0.63
Turnout		26,225	94.63%	▲2.65
Registered electors		27,714		▲7.76
INC gain from AITC		Swing	▼10.31	

=== Assembly Election 2012 ===
2012 Manipur Legislative Assembly election: Wangoi
Party	Candidate	Votes	%	±%
AITC	Oinam Lukhoi Singh	9,154	38.70%	New
NCP	Salam Joy Singh	8,972	37.93%	▲5.10
INC	Sagolsem Achouba Singh	5,312	22.46%	▲4.00
MSCP	Yumnam Mani Singh	218	0.92%	▼21.52
Margin of victory		182	0.77%	▼9.02
Turnout		23,656	91.98%	▼3.56
Registered electors		25,719		▲12.47
AITC gain from NCP		Swing	▲5.87	

=== Assembly Election 2007 ===
2007 Manipur Legislative Assembly election: Wangoi
Party	Candidate	Votes	%	±%
NCP	Salam Joy Singh	7,171	32.82%	New
RJD	Wahengbam Nipamacha Singh	5,033	23.04%	New
MSCP	Yumnam Mani Singh	4,903	22.44%	▼18.13
INC	Sagolsem Achouba Singh	4,031	18.45%	▼2.06
BJP	Moirangmayum Tombi Devi	445	2.04%	New
MPP	Oinam Jugindro Singh	265	1.21%	New
Margin of victory		2,138	9.79%	▲6.47
Turnout		21,848	95.54%	▼0.12
Registered electors		22,868		▲17.92
NCP gain from MSCP		Swing	▼7.75	

=== Assembly Election 2002 ===
2002 Manipur Legislative Assembly election: Wangoi
Party	Candidate	Votes	%	±%
MSCP	Yumnam Mani Singh	7,526	40.57%	▼0.61
Manipur National Conference	Wahengbam Nipamacha Singh	6,911	37.25%	New
INC	Sagolsem Achouba Singh	3,805	20.51%	▲10.11
DRPP	Naorem Rabei Singh	136	0.73%	New
Margin of victory		615	3.32%	▼5.59
Turnout		18,551	95.66%	▲0.98
Registered electors		19,393		▲6.30
MSCP hold		Swing	▼0.61	

=== Assembly Election 2000 ===
2000 Manipur Legislative Assembly election: Wangoi
Party	Candidate	Votes	%	±%
MSCP	Wahengbam Nipamacha Singh	7,113	41.18%	New
BJP	Yumnam Mani Singh	5,575	32.28%	New
INC	Sagolsem Achouba Singh	1,796	10.40%	▼13.03
MPP	Oinam Jugindro Singh	1,482	8.58%	▼11.53
CPI(M)	M. Indrasen Singh	1,134	6.57%	New
Margin of victory		1,538	8.90%	▲6.79
Turnout		17,273	94.68%	▼2.22
Registered electors		18,243		▲7.08
MSCP gain from INC		Swing	▲17.75	

=== Assembly Election 1995 ===
1995 Manipur Legislative Assembly election: Wangoi
Party	Candidate	Votes	%	±%
INC	W. Nipamacha Singh	3,868	23.43%	▼2.39
FPM	Y. Mani Singh	3,519	21.32%	New
MPP	Oinam Jugindro Singh	3,319	20.11%	▼1.56
SAP	M. Indrasen Singh	3,077	18.64%	New
JD	Sagolsem Achouba Singh	2,506	15.18%	▲6.23
Margin of victory		349	2.11%	▼2.86
Turnout		16,508	96.90%	▲3.14
Registered electors		17,036		▲5.87
INC gain from INS(SCS)		Swing	▼7.36	

=== Assembly Election 1990 ===
1990 Manipur Legislative Assembly election: Wangoi
Party	Candidate	Votes	%	±%
INS(SCS)	Nipamacha Singh	4,645	30.79%	New
INC	Chungkham Rajmohan Singh	3,895	25.82%	▼18.23
MPP	Oinam Jugindro Singh	3,268	21.66%	New
BJP	Longjam Laiba Singh	1,764	11.69%	New
JD	Moirangmayum Indrasen Singh	1,351	8.95%	New
Independent	Wangjam Shama Singh	80	0.53%	New
Margin of victory		750	4.97%	▼1.75
Turnout		15,087	93.76%	▲4.37
Registered electors		16,091		▲13.47
INS(SCS) gain from JP		Swing	▼19.98	

=== Assembly Election 1984 ===
1984 Manipur Legislative Assembly election: Wangoi
Party	Candidate	Votes	%	±%
JP	Wahengbam Nipamacha Singh	6,435	50.77%	▲15.55
INC	Chungkham Rajmohan Singh	5,583	44.04%	New
Independent	Y. Birendra	355	2.80%	New
Margin of victory		852	6.72%	▲0.78
Turnout		12,676	89.39%	▲0.14
Registered electors		14,181		▲9.69
JP gain from INC(I)		Swing	▲9.61	

=== Assembly Election 1980 ===
1980 Manipur Legislative Assembly election: Wangoi
Party	Candidate	Votes	%	±%
INC(I)	Chungkham Rajmohan Singh	4,749	41.16%	New
JP	Wahengbam Nipamacha Singh	4,063	35.21%	New
INC(U)	Yumnam Birendra	2,427	21.03%	New
Margin of victory		686	5.95%	▼3.87
Turnout		11,538	89.25%	▲3.16
Registered electors		12,928		▲25.95
INC(I) gain from INC		Swing	▼12.36	

=== Assembly Election 1974 ===
1974 Manipur Legislative Assembly election: Wangoi
Party	Candidate	Votes	%	±%
INC	W. Nipamacha Singh	4,729	53.52%	▲12.85
MPP	Chungkham Rajmohan Singh	3,862	43.71%	▼2.63
Margin of victory		867	9.81%	▲4.15
Turnout		8,836	86.09%	▼2.33
Registered electors		10,264		▲10.83
INC gain from MPP		Swing	▲7.18	

=== Assembly Election 1972 ===
1972 Manipur Legislative Assembly election: Wangoi
Party	Candidate	Votes	%	±%
MPP	Chungkham Rajmohan Singh	3,794	46.34%	New
INC	Wahengbam Nipamacha Singh	3,330	40.67%	New
CPI	Salam Krishnadas	767	9.37%	New
INC(O)	Thoudam Toyaima	166	2.03%	New
Margin of victory		464	5.67%	
Turnout		8,188	88.41%	
Registered electors		9,261		
MPP win (new seat)				

== See also ==
- List of constituencies of the Manipur Legislative Assembly
- Imphal West district
