= Lamlai Assembly constituency =

Legislative Assembly constituency in Manipur State, India

Coordinates: 24.87°N 94.05°E

Lamlai
- Constituency No. 8 for the Manipur Legislative Assembly

Constituency details
- Country: India
- Region: Northeast India
- State: Manipur
- District: Imphal East
- Lok Sabha constituency: Inner Manipur
- Established: 1967
- Total electors: 30,376
- Reservation: None

Member of Legislative Assembly
- 12th Manipur Legislative Assembly
- Incumbent Khongbantabam Ibomcha Singh
- Party: Bharatiya Janata Party
- Elected year: 2022

Lamlai is one of the 60 Legislative Assembly constituencies of Manipur state in India. It is part of Imphal East district and is a segment of the Inner Manipur Lok Sabha constituency. As of 2022, it is represented by Khongbantabam Ibomcha Singh of the Bharatiya Janata Party.

== Extent ==
Lamlai is the 8th of the 60 assembly constituencies of Manipur. It has 40 parts namely: 1 - Sawombung, 2 - Sawombung Kabui, 3 - Itam Nungoi, 4 - Sekta Awang Leikai, 5 - Huidrom, 6 - Sekta Mayai Leikai, 7 - Sekta Makha Leikai, 8 - Pungdongbam Awang Mamang Leikai, 9 - Pungdongbam Awang Maning Leikai, 10 - Pungdongbam Makha Leikai, 11 - Kharasom, 12 - Nungoi, 13 - Yourbung Mayai Leikai, 14 - Yourbung Maning Leikai, 15 - Chalou, 16 - Napet, 17 - Lamlai Awang Leikai, 18 - Lamlai Mayai Leikai, 19 - Lamlai Makha Leikai, 20 - Leimakhong Mapal, 21 - Tellou, 22 - Chana, 23 - Seijang Makha Leikai, 24 - Seijang Awang Leikai, 25 - Sabungkhok, 26 - Yaingangpokpi, 27 - Thamnapokpi, 28 - Kameng, 29 - Nongada Awang Leikai, 30 - Nongren (A), 31 - Nongren (B), 32 - Nongdam, 33 - Oksu, 34 - Takhel Makha Leikai, 35 - Takhel Mamang Leikai, 36 - Kanghuchingjil, 37 - Sanjenbam Khunou, 38 - Sanjenbam Khulen, 39 - Heirok, and 40 - Terakhong.

== Members of the Legislative Assembly ==
Year	Winner	Party
1972	Pheiroijam Parijat Singh	Communist Party of India
1974	Pheiroijam Parijat Singh	Communist Party of India
1980	Pheiroijam Parijat Singh	Communist Party of India
1984	Yumkhaibam Kerani Singh	Indian National Congress
1990	Pheiroijam Parijat Singh	Communist Party of India
1995	Kshetrimayum Biren Singh	Manipur Peoples Party
2000	Kshetrimayum Biren Singh	Manipur State Congress Party
2002	Pheiroijam Parijat Singh	Communist Party of India
2007	Pheiroijam Parijat Singh	Communist Party of India
2012	Kshetrimayum Biren Singh	Indian National Congress
2017	Kshetrimayum Biren Singh	Indian National Congress
2022	Khongbantabam Ibomcha	Bharatiya Janata Party

== Election results ==
Vote share of winning candidates
2022	35.25%
2017	48.02%
2012	43.03%
2007	33.96%
2002	30.41%
2000	33.98%
1995	37.30%
1990	29.69%
1984	42.88%
1980	41.13%
1974	29.98%
1972	26.57%

=== 2027 Assembly election ===
2027 Manipur Legislative Assembly election: Lamlai
Party	Candidate	Votes	%	±%
INC				
NDA				
NOTA	None of the above			
Majority				
Turnout				
gain from		Swing		

=== 2022 Assembly election ===
2022 Manipur Legislative Assembly election: Lamlai
Party	Candidate	Votes	%	±%
BJP	Khongbantabam Ibomcha	10,105	35.25%	−9.45%
JD(U)	Kshetrimayum Biren Singh	9,984	34.83%	
INC	Achoibam Deben Singh	7,049	24.59%	−23.43%
RPI(A)	Mongjam Poireihenba Meetei	957	3.34%	
Independent	Sapam Kangleipal Meitei	458	1.60%	
Margin of victory		121	0.42%	−2.89%
Turnout		28,665	94.37%	−0.07%
Registered electors		30,376		11.64%
BJP gain from INC		Swing	-12.77%	

=== 2017 Assembly election ===
2017 Manipur Legislative Assembly election: Lamlai
Party	Candidate	Votes	%	±%
INC	Kshetrimayum Biren Singh	12,339	48.02%	4.99%
BJP	Khongbantabam Ibomcha	11,487	44.70%	
CPI	Huirem Bimol	1,712	6.66%	−28.63%
NOTA	None of the Above	158	0.61%	
Margin of victory		852	3.32%	−4.42%
Turnout		25,696	94.44%	1.57%
Registered electors		27,210		9.57%
INC hold		Swing	4.99%	

=== 2012 Assembly election ===
2012 Manipur Legislative Assembly election: Lamlai
Party	Candidate	Votes	%	±%
INC	Kshetrimayum Biren Singh	9,923	43.03%	9.18%
CPI	Pheiroijam Parijat Singh	8,139	35.29%	1.33%
AITC	Kh. Ibomcha	4,973	21.56%	
Margin of victory		1,784	7.74%	7.62%
Turnout		23,062	92.76%	0.15%
Registered electors		24,833		1.60%
INC gain from CPI		Swing	9.07%	

=== 2007 Assembly election ===
2007 Manipur Legislative Assembly election: Lamlai
Party	Candidate	Votes	%	±%
CPI	Pheiroijam Parijat Singh	7,696	33.96%	3.55%
INC	Kshetrimayum Biren Singh	7,670	33.85%	32.99%
NCP	Khongbantabam Ibomcha Singh	7,296	32.19%	2.84%
Margin of victory		26	0.11%	−0.93%
Turnout		22,662	92.72%	2.59%
Registered electors		24,441		17.44%
CPI hold		Swing	3.55%	

=== 2002 Assembly election ===
2002 Manipur Legislative Assembly election: Lamlai
Party	Candidate	Votes	%	±%
CPI	Pheiroijam Parijat Singh	5,652	30.41%	0.41%
NCP	Khongbantabam Ibomcha Singh	5,457	29.36%	24.92%
FPM	Kshetrimayum Biren Singh	5,359	28.83%	
MSCP	Khumanthem Saratkumar Singh	1,669	8.98%	−25.00%
DRPP	Moirangthem Nilamani Singh	165	0.89%	
INC	Telem Dara Singh	159	0.86%	
BJP	Irom Sunder Singh	128	0.69%	−19.56%
Margin of victory		195	1.05%	−2.94%
Turnout		18,589	90.13%	−3.56%
Registered electors		20,811		−0.75%
CPI gain from MSCP		Swing	-6.90%	

=== 2000 Assembly election ===
2000 Manipur Legislative Assembly election: Lamlai
Party	Candidate	Votes	%	±%
MSCP	Kshetrimayum Biren Singh	6,148	33.98%	
CPI	Pheiroijam Parijat Singh	5,427	30.00%	−0.89%
BJP	Khongbantabam Ibomcha Singh	3,663	20.25%	
SAP	Khumanthem Saratkumar Singh	2,053	11.35%	
NCP	Yumkhaibam Goutam Singh	802	4.43%	
Margin of victory		721	3.98%	−2.43%
Turnout		18,093	87.21%	−6.49%
Registered electors		20,969		16.38%
MSCP gain from MPP		Swing	-3.32%	

=== 1995 Assembly election ===
1995 Manipur Legislative Assembly election: Lamlai
Party	Candidate	Votes	%	±%
MPP	Kshetrimayum Biren Singh	6,202	37.30%	8.52%
CPI	Pheiroijam Parijat Singh	5,135	30.89%	1.19%
INC	Khongbantabam Ibomcha Singh	4,802	28.88%	12.36%
FPM	Kamei Sanahal	487	2.93%	
Margin of victory		1,067	6.42%	5.51%
Turnout		16,626	93.69%	7.93%
Registered electors		18,017		−5.35%
MPP gain from CPI		Swing	7.61%	

=== 1990 Assembly election ===
1990 Manipur Legislative Assembly election: Lamlai
Party	Candidate	Votes	%	±%
CPI	Pheiroijam Parijat Singh	4,817	29.69%	−1.58%
MPP	Kshetrimayum Biren Singh	4,669	28.78%	
NPP	Y. Kerani Singh	2,912	17.95%	
INC	Khongbantabam Ibomcha Singh	2,680	16.52%	−26.36%
INS(SCS)	Chabungbam Khomei Singh	1,144	7.05%	
Margin of victory		148	0.91%	−10.69%
Turnout		16,222	85.76%	3.80%
Registered electors		19,035		25.24%
CPI gain from INC		Swing	-13.18%	

=== 1984 Assembly election ===
1984 Manipur Legislative Assembly election: Lamlai
Party	Candidate	Votes	%	±%
INC	Yumkhaibam Kerani Singh	5,218	42.88%	
CPI	Pheiroijam Parijat Singh	3,806	31.27%	−9.85%
Independent	Chabungbam Khomei Singh	1,374	11.29%	
IC(S)	Telem Nityai	871	7.16%	
Independent	Takhemyum Kumar Singh	749	6.15%	
Independent	Ningthoujam Shyama	95	0.78%	
Margin of victory		1,412	11.60%	0.99%
Turnout		12,170	81.97%	5.56%
Registered electors		15,199		11.23%
INC gain from CPI		Swing	1.75%	

=== 1980 Assembly election ===
1980 Manipur Legislative Assembly election: Lamlai
Party	Candidate	Votes	%	±%
CPI	Pheiroijam Parijat Singh	4,197	41.13%	11.14%
INC(I)	Yumkhibam Kerani	3,114	30.51%	
MPP	Ningthoujam Kumar	1,157	11.34%	1.60%
JP	Somurailatpam Khomb	969	9.50%	
Independent	Telem Nityai	768	7.53%	
Margin of victory		1,083	10.61%	2.27%
Turnout		10,205	76.41%	−5.77%
Registered electors		13,664		19.03%
CPI hold		Swing	11.14%	

=== 1974 Assembly election ===
1974 Manipur Legislative Assembly election: Lamlai
Party	Candidate	Votes	%	±%
CPI	Pheiroijam Parijat Singh	2,797	29.98%	3.42%
Independent	Yumkhaibam Kerani Singh	2,019	21.64%	
INC(O)	Telem Nityai	1,781	19.09%	
Independent	R. S. Somi	1,500	16.08%	
MPP	Yaikhom Tomba Singh	908	9.73%	−4.88%
Independent	Lourembam Bheiro	323	3.46%	
Margin of victory		778	8.34%	3.57%
Turnout		9,328	82.18%	6.49%
Registered electors		11,479		−3.97%
CPI hold		Swing	3.42%	

=== 1972 Assembly election ===
1972 Manipur Legislative Assembly election: Lamlai
Party	Candidate	Votes	%	±%
CPI	Pheiroijam Parijat Singh	2,331	26.57%	
INC	Telem Nityai	1,912	21.79%	
Socialist Labour Party (India)	Leishungbam Cheiteino	1,669	19.02%	
MPP	B. S. Somi	1,282	14.61%	
INC(O)	Hijam Herando	1,247	14.21%	
CPI(M)	T. Ibotombi Singh	333	3.80%	
Margin of victory		419	4.78%	
Turnout		8,774	75.68%	
Registered electors		11,954		
CPI win (new seat)				

== See also ==
- List of constituencies of the Manipur Legislative Assembly
- Imphal East district
