= Thangmeiband Assembly constituency =

Legislative Assembly constituency in Manipur State, India

Coordinates: 24.82°N 93.93°E

Thangmeiband
- Constituency No. 9 for the Manipur Legislative Assembly
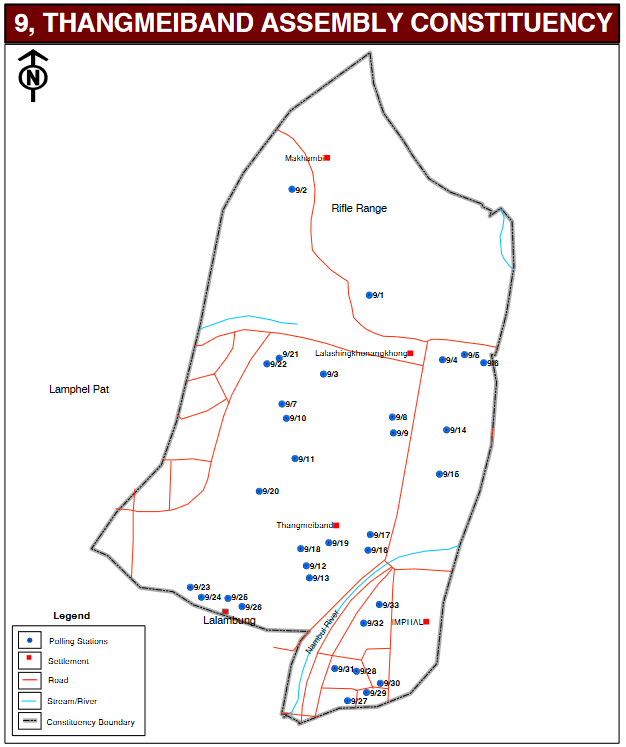

Constituency details
- Country: India
- Region: Northeast India
- State: Manipur
- District: Imphal West
- Lok Sabha constituency: Inner Manipur
- Established: 1972
- Total electors: 28,212
- Reservation: None

Member of Legislative Assembly
- 12th Manipur Legislative Assembly
- Incumbent Khumukcham Joykisan Singh
- Party: BJP
- Alliance: NDA
- Elected year: 2022
- Preceded by: Radhabinod Koijam, NCP

Thangmeiband (Vidhan Sabha constituency) is one of the 60 Vidhan Sabha constituencies in the Indian state of Manipur.

== Extent ==
Thangmeiband is the 9th Assembly Constituency among the 60 constituencies of Manipur. It has 42 parts, namely

1. Thangmeiband SInam Leikai (West)
2. Thangmeiband Sinam Leikai (East)
3. Langol Tarung
4. Guigailong
5. Tharon
6. Muchi Khul
7. Thangmeiband Yumnam Leika (A)
8. Thangmeiband Yumnam Leika (B)
9. Thangmeiband Yumnam Leika (C)
10. Thangmeiband Yumnam Leika (A)
11. Thangmeiband Yumnam Leika (B)
12. Thangmeiband Maisnam Leikai (A)
13. Thangmeiband Maisnam Leikai (B)
14. Thangmeiband Hijam Leikai (A)
15. Thangmeiband Hijam Leikai (B)
16. Thangmeiband Polem Lekai (A)
17. Thangmeiband Polem Lekai (B)
18. DM College Campus (A)
19. DM College Campus (B)
20. DM College Campus (C)
21. DM College Campus (D)
22. DM College Campus (E)
23. Thangmeiband Lamabam Leikai (A)
24. Thangmeiband Polem Leikai
25. Thangmeiband Lamabam Leikai (B)
26. Thangmeiband Hijam Dewan Leikai (A)
27. Thangmeiband Hijam Dewan Leikai (B)
28. Thangmeiband Khomdram Selungba Leikai
29. Thangmeiband Hijam Dewan Leikai (C)
30. Lalambung Makhong (A)
31. Lalambung Makhong (B)
32. Lalambung Makhong (C)
33. Lalambung Makhong (D)
34. Lalambung Makhong (E)
35. Lalambung Makhong (F)
36. Thangal Bazar Part-1 (A)
37. Thangal Bazar Part-1 (B)
38. Thangal Bazar Part-2 (A)
39. Thangal Bazar Part-1 (B)
40. Thangal Bazar Part-3 (A)
41. Thangal Bazar Part-3 (B)
42. Major Khul.

== Members of Legislative Assembly ==
Year	Member	Party
1972	Shagolsem Bomcha	Indian National Congress
1974	Maibam Gouramani	Manipur Revolutionary Party
1980	Radhabinod Koijam	Independent
1984	Radhabinod Koijam	Indian National Congress
1990	Ngangbam Kumarjit	Manipur Peoples Party
1995	Radhabinod Koijam	Indian National Congress
2000	Radhabinod Koijam	Indian National Congress
2002	Meinam Bhorot Singh	Bharatiya Janata Party
2007	Radhabinod Koijam	Nationalist Congress Party
2012	Khumukcham Joykishan	All India Trinamool Congress
2015 by-election	Khumukcham Joykishan	Bharatiya Janata Party
2017	Khumukcham Joykishan	Indian National Congress
2022	Khumukcham Joykishan	Bharatiya Janata Party

== Election results ==
Vote share of winning candidates
2022	56.08%
2017	48.84%
2015 by-election	53.96%
2012	36.00%
2007	35.13%
2002	38.67%
2000	33.43%
1995	46.16%
1990	59.68%
1984	44.73%
1980	22.64%
1974	51.53%
1972	44.03%

=== 2027 Assembly election ===
2027 Manipur Legislative Assembly election: Thangmeiband
Party	Candidate	Votes	%	±%
INC				
NDA				
NOTA	None of the above			
Majority				
Turnout				
gain from		Swing		

=== Assembly Election 2022 ===
2022 Manipur Legislative Assembly election: Thangmeiband
Party	Candidate	Votes	%	±%
JD(U)	Khumukcham Joykishan	13,629	56.08%	
BJP	Jotin Waikhom	9,856	40.56%	−7.62%
INC	Hijam Nutanchandra Singh	457	1.88%	−46.96%
NOTA	Nota	360	1.48%	0.90%
Margin of victory		3,773	15.53%	14.86%
Turnout		24,302	86.14%	2.77%
Registered electors		28,212		−0.95%
JD(U) gain from INC		Swing	7.25%	

=== Assembly Election 2017 ===
2017 Manipur Legislative Assembly election: Thangmeiband
Party	Candidate	Votes	%	±%
INC	Khumukcham Joykishan	11,596	48.84%	17.45%
BJP	Jotin Waikhom	11,439	48.17%	46.48%
Peoples Resurgence and Justice Alliance	Erendro Leichombam	573	2.41%	
NOTA	None of the Above	137	0.58%	
Margin of victory		157	0.66%	−3.96%
Turnout		23,745	83.37%	5.09%
Registered electors		28,482		4.66%
INC gain from AITC		Swing		

=== 2015 by-election ===
2015 Manipur Legislative Assembly by-election: Thangmeiband
Party	Candidate	Votes	%	±%
BJP	Khumukcham Joykishan	12,104	53.96	+52.27
INC	Jyotin Waikhom	10,197	45.45	+14.06
MDPF	Dr. Gurumayum Tonsana Sharma	55	0.24	N/A
NOTA	None of the above	72	0.32	N/A
Majority		1,907	8.51	+3.89
Turnout		22,428	85.22	+6.92
Registered electors		26,315		
BJP gain from AITC		Swing		

=== Assembly Election 2012 ===
2012 Manipur Legislative Assembly election: Thangmeiband
Party	Candidate	Votes	%	±%
AITC	Khumukcham Joykishan	7,670	36.00%	
INC	Jotin Waikhom	6,686	31.39%	1.86%
NCP	Radhabinod Koijam	3,872	18.18%	−16.95%
MSCP	Indrajit	2,713	12.74%	
BJP	Meinam Bhorot Singh	360	1.69%	−20.00%
Margin of victory		984	4.62%	−0.98%
Turnout		21,303	78.27%	0.93%
Registered electors		27,215		4.54%
AITC gain from NCP		Swing	0.87%	

=== Assembly Election 2007 ===
2007 Manipur Legislative Assembly election: Thangmeiband
Party	Candidate	Votes	%	±%
NCP	Radhabinod Koijam	7,073	35.13%	
INC	Jotin Waikhom	5,945	29.53%	16.60%
BJP	Meinam Bhorot Singh	4,367	21.69%	−16.98%
MPP	Dr. Chingtham Chandramani Singh	2,562	12.72%	
RJD	Salam Nabachandra Singh	185	0.92%	
Margin of victory		1,128	5.60%	−3.77%
Turnout		20,134	77.34%	1.30%
Registered electors		26,032		14.48%
NCP gain from BJP		Swing	-3.54%	

=== Assembly Election 2002 ===
2002 Manipur Legislative Assembly election: Thangmeiband
Party	Candidate	Votes	%	±%
BJP	Meinam Bhorot Singh	6,686	38.67%	10.06%
SAP	Radhabinod Koijam	5,066	29.30%	
INC	Salam Nabachandra Singh	2,235	12.93%	−20.50%
MSCP	Khumanthem Devabrata Singh	1,363	7.88%	−13.45%
FPM	Bhinoy Singh Ningthoujam	1,098	6.35%	−10.29%
DRPP	Sarat Kumar Naorem	580	3.35%	
SJP(R)	Mayanglambam Jane Singh	166	0.96%	
Margin of victory		1,620	9.37%	4.55%
Turnout		17,292	76.05%	−5.33%
Registered electors		22,739		0.33%
BJP gain from INC		Swing	-7.50%	

=== Assembly Election 2000 ===
2000 Manipur Legislative Assembly election: Thangmeiband
Party	Candidate	Votes	%	±%
INC	Radhabinod Koijam	5,983	33.43%	−12.74%
BJP	Meinam Bhorot Singh	5,120	28.60%	17.48%
MSCP	Ningthoujam Benoy Singh	3,818	21.33%	
FPM	Dr. Naorem Sarat Kumar Singh	2,978	16.64%	13.33%
Margin of victory		863	4.82%	−5.53%
Turnout		17,899	79.65%	−1.72%
Registered electors		22,664		9.78%
INC hold		Swing	-12.74%	

=== Assembly Election 1995 ===
1995 Manipur Legislative Assembly election: Thangmeiband
Party	Candidate	Votes	%	±%
INC	Radhabinod Koijam	7,666	46.16%	7.06%
SAP	Ningthoujam Binoy Singh	5,947	35.81%	
BJP	Meinam Bhorot Singh	1,848	11.13%	
FPM	Laikhuram Jayentakumar	549	3.31%	
MPP	Ngangbam Kumarjit	545	3.28%	−56.40%
Margin of victory		1,719	10.35%	−10.23%
Turnout		16,606	81.38%	−0.19%
Registered electors		20,644		0.71%
INC gain from MPP		Swing	-13.52%	

=== Assembly Election 1990 ===
1990 Manipur Legislative Assembly election: Thangmeiband
Party	Candidate	Votes	%	±%
MPP	Ngangbam Kumarjit	9,885	59.68%	51.56%
INC	Koijam Radhabinod Singh	6,476	39.10%	−5.63%
JD	Gurumayum Nimaichand Sharma	201	1.21%	
Margin of victory		3,409	20.58%	1.04%
Turnout		16,562	81.56%	5.13%
Registered electors		20,499		17.28%
MPP gain from INC		Swing	14.96%	

=== Assembly Election 1984 ===
1984 Manipur Legislative Assembly election: Thangmeiband
Party	Candidate	Votes	%	±%
INC	Koijam Radhabinod Singh	5,826	44.73%	
Independent	Ningthoujam Benoy Singh	3,281	25.19%	
Independent	Ng. Ibochouba Singh	2,061	15.82%	
MPP	Ngangbam Kumarjit	1,058	8.12%	−4.81%
BJP	Meinam Bhorot Singh	667	5.12%	
JP	Shamulailatpam Gourachandra	132	1.01%	
Margin of victory		2,545	19.54%	15.11%
Turnout		13,025	76.44%	9.65%
Registered electors		17,478		12.47%
INC gain from Independent		Swing	22.09%	

=== Assembly Election 1980 ===
1980 Manipur Legislative Assembly election: Thangmeiband
Party	Candidate	Votes	%	±%
Independent	Radhabinod Koijam	2,274	22.64%	
Independent	Gangummei	1,829	18.21%	
MPP	Ngangbam Kumarjit	1,299	12.93%	−38.60%
INC(I)	Kh. Apabi	1,289	12.83%	
JP	R. K. Jabotbihari	1,163	11.58%	
Independent	Maisnam Modhumangol	957	9.53%	
INC(U)	M. Punyabati	349	3.47%	
Independent	S. Indramani	349	3.47%	
Independent	Aribam Gourakrishna	306	3.05%	
Independent	S. Ibochow	229	2.28%	
Margin of victory		445	4.43%	−4.72%
Turnout		10,044	66.79%	−5.83%
Registered electors		15,540		34.70%
Independent gain from MPP		Swing	-28.89%	

=== Assembly Election 1974 ===
1974 Manipur Legislative Assembly election: Thangmeiband
Party	Candidate	Votes	%	±%
MPP	Maibam Gouramani	4,235	51.53%	23.35%
INC	Sagolsem Ibomcha	3,483	42.38%	−1.65%
Independent	Achoibam Banbihari	500	6.08%	
Margin of victory		752	9.15%	−6.69%
Turnout		8,218	72.62%	4.42%
Registered electors		11,537		4.31%
MPP gain from INC		Swing	7.50%	

=== Assembly Election 1972 ===
1972 Manipur Legislative Assembly election: Thangmeiband
Party	Candidate	Votes	%	±%
INC	Shagolsemi Bomcha	3,249	44.03%	
MPP	Maibam Gouramani	2,080	28.19%	
Independent	Yumnam Nilamani Singh	2,050	27.78%	
Margin of victory		1,169	15.84%	
Turnout		7,379	68.20%	
Registered electors		11,060		
INC win (new seat)				

== See also ==
- Imphal West district
- Manipur Legislative Assembly
- List of constituencies of Manipur Legislative Assembly
