= Thongam Shanti Singh =

Indian politician

Member of the Manipur Legislative Assembly

Thongam Shanti Singh (born 1961) is an Indian politician from Manipur. He is an MLA from Moirang Assembly constituency in Bishnupur District. He won the 2022 Manipur Legislative Assembly election, representing the National People's Party.

== Early life and education ==
Singh is from Kiyam Leikai, Moirang post, Bishnupur District, Manipur. He is the son of late Thongam Ibohal Singh. He married Philem Sorojini Devi and they have a son, Shangkerson Thongam. He completed his pre-university course in science in 1980 at Moirang College, which is affiliated with Manipur University.

== Career ==
Singh won from Moirang Assembly constituency representing the National People's Party in the 2022 Manipur Legislative Assembly election. He polled 14,349 votes and defeated his nearest rival and sitting MLA, M. Prithviraj Singh of the Bharatiya Janata Party, by 2,231 votes. In March 2024, he was active in demanding the Assembly pass a resolution to call upon the Centre to abrogate the 'Suspension of Operations' ties with all Kuki-Zo underground militant groups with whom agreements had been made in the past. Later, the Manipur Legislative Assembly passed a resolution to that effect.
