= Sekmai Assembly constituency =

Legislative Assembly constituency in Manipur State, India

Coordinates: 24.97°N 93.89°E

Sekmai
- Constituency No. 16 for the Manipur Legislative Assembly

Constituency details
- Country: India
- Region: Northeast India
- State: Manipur
- District: Imphal West
- Lok Sabha constituency: Inner Manipur
- Established: 1967
- Total electors: 30,487
- Reservation: SC

Member of Legislative Assembly
- 12th Manipur Legislative Assembly
- Incumbent Heikham Dingo Singh
- Party: Bharatiya Janata Party

Sekmai is one of the 60 Legislative Assembly constituencies of Manipur state in India.

It is part of Imphal West district and is reserved for candidates belonging to the Scheduled Castes.

== Extent ==
Sekmai is the 16th of the 60 constituencies of Manipur. It has 41 parts namely: 1 - Kanglatongbi Mandir, 2 - Kanglatongbi Hatikhuwa, 3 - Kanglatongbi Shantipur, 4 - Kanglatongbi (A), 5 - Kanglatongbi Bazaar Board, 6 - Kanglatongbi (B), 7 - Sekmai Bazar, 8 - Sekmai Koujengleima, 9 - Sekmai (A), 10 - Sekmai (B), 11 - Sekmai Luwangbung, 12 - Sekmai Nongthomband, 13 - Sekmai Awang Leikai (A), 14 - Sekmai Awang Leikai (B), 15 - Khurkhul Awang Leikai (A), 16 - Khurkhul Awang Leikai (B), 17 - Khurkhul Makha Mamang Leikai, 18 - Khurkhul Makha Leikai, 19 - Khurkhul, 20 - Kanto, 21 - Kanto Sabal, 22 - Senjam Chirang, 23 - Senjam Khunnou, 24 - Loitang Khunou, 25 - Loitang Leikinthabi, 26 - Phumlou (A), 27 - Phumlou (B), 28 - Phayeng (A), 29 - Phayeng Awang Leikai (A), 30 - Phayeng Awang Leikai (B), 31 - Phayeng (B), 32 - Phayeng Sabal Leikai, 33 - Lairenkabi, 34 - Lamlongei, 35 - Lairensajik, 36 - Kadangband, 37 - Koutruk, 38 - Haorang Keirel, 39 - Sanjenbam, 40 - Tairenpokpi, and 41 - Sairemkhul.

== Members of the Legislative Assembly ==
Year	Member	Party
2017	Heikham Dingo Singh	Bharatiya Janata Party
2022	Heikham Dingo Singh	Bharatiya Janata Party

== Election results ==
Vote share of winning candidates
2022	36.80%
2017	54.82%
2012	28.43%
2007	35.58%
2002	34.01%
2000	34.40%
1995	33.25%
1990	29.41%
1984	44.48%
1980	34.84%
1974	53.31%
1972	50.13%
1967	42.54%

=== 2027 Assembly election ===
2027 Manipur Legislative Assembly election: Sekmai
Party	Candidate	Votes	%	±%
INC				
NDA				
NOTA	None of the above			
Majority				
Turnout				
gain from		Swing		

=== Assembly Election 2022 ===
2022 Manipur Legislative Assembly election: Sekmai
Party	Candidate	Votes	%	±%
BJP	Heikham Dingo Singh	10,010	36.80%	−18.02%
NPP	Ayangbam Oken Singh	6,677	24.55%	
JD(U)	Khwairakpam Devendro Singh	5,966	21.93%	
NCP	Ningthoujam Popilal Singh	2,007	7.38%	
INC	Ningthoujam Biren Singh	1,595	5.86%	−38.41%
SS	Khaidem Ranjit Singh	471	1.73%	
NOTA	Nota	190	0.70%	−0.21%
Independent	Khwairakpam Robin Singh	186	0.68%	
Margin of victory		3,333	12.25%	1.71%
Turnout		27,201	89.22%	0.23%
Registered electors		30,487		12.99%
BJP hold		Swing	-18.02%	

=== Assembly Election 2017 ===
2017 Manipur Legislative Assembly election: Sekmai
Party	Candidate	Votes	%	±%
BJP	Heikham Dingo Singh	13,163	54.82%	
INC	Khwairakpam Devendro Singh	10,631	44.27%	15.84%
NOTA	None of the Above	219	0.91%	
Margin of victory		2,532	10.54%	7.39%
Turnout		24,013	89.00%	0.87%
Registered electors		26,982		14.65%
BJP gain from INC		Swing	26.38%	

=== Assembly Election 2012 ===
2012 Manipur Legislative Assembly election: Sekmai
Party	Candidate	Votes	%	±%
INC	Khwairakpam Devendro Singh	5,897	28.43%	−3.18%
AITC	Heikham Dingo Singh	5,242	25.28%	
CPI	Ayangbam Oken Singh	4,983	24.03%	−11.56%
NCP	Ningthoujam Biren	4,611	22.23%	
Margin of victory		655	3.16%	−0.81%
Turnout		20,739	88.10%	5.22%
Registered electors		23,534		−1.83%
INC gain from CPI		Swing	-7.15%	

=== Assembly Election 2007 ===
2007 Manipur Legislative Assembly election: Sekmai
Party	Candidate	Votes	%	±%
CPI	Dr. Heikham Borajao Singh	7,072	35.58%	
INC	Ningthoujam Biren	6,284	31.62%	12.73%
MPP	Khwairakpam Devendro Singh	5,943	29.90%	
SAP	Moirangthem Ibomcha	343	1.73%	−18.61%
Independent	M. Thaninjao	207	1.04%	
Margin of victory		788	3.96%	−3.29%
Turnout		19,875	82.91%	−6.26%
Registered electors		23,973		19.64%
CPI gain from FPM		Swing	1.57%	

=== Assembly Election 2002 ===
2002 Manipur Legislative Assembly election: Sekmai
Party	Candidate	Votes	%	±%
FPM	Ningthoujam Biren	6,023	34.01%	
NCP	Khwairakpam Chandra	4,739	26.76%	
SAP	Dr. Heikham Borajao Singh	3,602	20.34%	15.30%
INC	Amujao Khwairakpam	3,345	18.89%	−8.09%
Margin of victory		1,284	7.25%	6.44%
Turnout		17,709	89.17%	−1.75%
Registered electors		20,038		5.90%
FPM gain from BJP		Swing	0.76%	

=== Assembly Election 2000 ===
2000 Manipur Legislative Assembly election: Sekmai
Party	Candidate	Votes	%	±%
BJP	Khwairakpam Chandra	5,745	34.40%	
MSCP	Ningthoujam Biren	5,609	33.58%	
INC	Dr. Heikham Borajao Singh	4,507	26.98%	−6.26%
SAP	Moirangthem Ibomcha	842	5.04%	−9.59%
Margin of victory		136	0.81%	−3.87%
Turnout		16,703	89.23%	−1.68%
Registered electors		18,921		7.27%
BJP gain from INC		Swing	1.15%	

=== Assembly Election 1995 ===
1995 Manipur Legislative Assembly election: Sekmai
Party	Candidate	Votes	%	±%
INC	Ningthoujam Biren	5,197	33.25%	3.84%
MPP	Khwirakpam Chaoba	4,465	28.57%	1.72%
Independent	Usham Leirijao	3,682	23.56%	
SAP	Khwairakpam Angangjao	2,287	14.63%	
Margin of victory		732	4.68%	2.12%
Turnout		15,631	90.91%	1.20%
Registered electors		17,638		10.39%
INC hold		Swing	3.84%	

=== Assembly Election 1990 ===
1990 Manipur Legislative Assembly election: Sekmai
Party	Candidate	Votes	%	±%
INC	Ningthoujam Biren	4,188	29.41%	−15.07%
MPP	Khwirakpam Chaoba	3,823	26.85%	−8.11%
JD	Khwairakpam Angangjao	3,310	23.24%	
BJP	Khangenbam Leirijao	2,919	20.50%	
Margin of victory		365	2.56%	−6.96%
Turnout		14,240	89.71%	5.51%
Registered electors		15,978		15.60%
INC hold		Swing	-15.07%	

=== Assembly Election 1984 ===
1984 Manipur Legislative Assembly election: Sekmai
Party	Candidate	Votes	%	±%
INC	Khangembam Leirijao	4,976	44.48%	
MPP	Khwai Rakpam Chaoba	3,911	34.96%	
Independent	Khwairakpam Angang Jao	2,301	20.57%	
Margin of victory		1,065	9.52%	−0.13%
Turnout		11,188	84.20%	1.71%
Registered electors		13,822		7.57%
INC gain from JP		Swing	9.64%	

=== Assembly Election 1980 ===
1980 Manipur Legislative Assembly election: Sekmai
Party	Candidate	Votes	%	±%
JP	Khwirakpam Chaoba	3,568	34.84%	
INC(I)	Khangembam Leirijao	2,580	25.19%	
CPI	Kh. Omor	2,385	23.29%	
JP(S)	Kh. Angangjao	1,001	9.77%	
Independent	Angom Nganba	707	6.90%	
Margin of victory		988	9.65%	3.03%
Turnout		10,241	82.49%	−6.80%
Registered electors		12,849		25.41%
JP gain from MPP		Swing	-18.47%	

=== Assembly Election 1974 ===
1974 Manipur Legislative Assembly election: Sekmai
Party	Candidate	Votes	%	±%
MPP	Khwirakpam Chaoba	4,734	53.31%	3.18%
INC	Khangembam Leirijao	4,146	46.69%	−3.18%
Margin of victory		588	6.62%	6.36%
Turnout		8,880	89.29%	13.32%
Registered electors		10,246		29.16%
MPP hold		Swing	3.18%	

=== Assembly Election 1972 ===
1972 Manipur Legislative Assembly election: Sekmai
Party	Candidate	Votes	%	±%
MPP	Khwirakpam Chaoba	2,930	50.13%	
INC	Khangembam Leirijao	2,915	49.87%	7.34%
Margin of victory		15	0.26%	−16.13%
Turnout		5,845	75.97%	−2.22%
Registered electors		7,933		−39.66%
MPP gain from INC		Swing	7.59%	

=== Assembly Election 1967 ===
1967 Manipur Legislative Assembly election: Sekmai
Party	Candidate	Votes	%	±%
INC	Khwirakpam Chaoba	4,206	42.54%	
CPI	K. Jugeshwro	2,586	26.15%	
Independent	K. Ambika	2,201	22.26%	
Independent	A. Nganba	895	9.05%	
Margin of victory		1,620	16.38%	
Turnout		9,888	78.19%	
Registered electors		13,148		
INC win (new seat)				

== See also ==
- List of constituencies of the Manipur Legislative Assembly
- Imphal West district
