= Lamsang Assembly constituency =

Legislative Assembly constituency in Manipur State, India

Coordinates: 24.82°N 93.87°E

Lamsang
- Constituency No. 17 for the Manipur Legislative Assembly

Constituency details
- Country: India
- Region: Northeast India
- State: Manipur
- District: Imphal West
- Lok Sabha constituency: Inner Manipur
- Established: 1972
- Total electors: 33,787
- Reservation: None

Member of Legislative Assembly
- 12th Manipur Legislative Assembly
- Incumbent Sorokhaibam Rajen
- Party: Bharatiya Janata Party

Lamsang Legislative Assembly constituency is one of the 60 Legislative Assembly constituencies of Manipur state in India.

It is part of Imphal West district.

== Extent ==
Lamsang is the 17th of 60 constituencies of Manipur. It consists of 49 parts namely: 1 - Awang Leikinthabi Awang Leikai, 2 - Awang Leikinthabi Makha Leikai, 3 - Awang Wabgai, 4 - Tingri, 5 - Maharabi, 6 - Potsangbam Khullen Khoiru, 7 - Potsangbam Khullen Thouriphi, 8 - Khonghampat Khullen (A), 9 - Khonghampat Khullen (B), 10 - Khonghampat Khunou, 11 - Mantri Leikai, 12 - Khamaral, 13 - Kameng, 14 - Mana-Ingkhol, 15 - Tendongyan, 16 - Pheidinga, 17 - Loitang Khullen, 18 - Mayang Langjing Taning Awang Leikai, 19 - Mayang Langjing Taning Makha Leikai, 20 - Mayang Langjing Tamang, 21 - Akham, 22 - Lamdeng (A), 23 - Lamdeng (B), 24 - Lamdeng Khunoun (A), 25 - Lamdeng Khunou (B), 26 - Awang khunou, 27 - Awang Khunou Sorok Maning, 28 - Awang Khunou Sorok Mamang, 29 - Salam Keikhu, 30 - Salam Keikhu, 31 - Tharoijam, 32 - Heibongpokpi, 33 - Haorang Sabal, 34 - Lamsang, 35 - Lambal, 36 - Taothong Ayungba, 37 - Taothong Apheiba, 38 - Taothong, 39 - Khullem Leikai (A), 40 - Khullem Leikai (B), 41 - Khullem Leikai (C), 42 - Khullem Leikai (D), 43 - Luker (A), 44 - Kiyam, 45 - Luker (B), 46 - Maklang, 47 - Leitong, 48 - Thangjing Khullen, and 49 - Sangaithel.

== Members of the Legislative Assembly ==
Year	Winner	Party
1972	Laishram Samungouba Singh	Manipur Peoples Party
1974	Khundongbam Jugeswar	Communist Party of India
1980	Phuritsabam Sagar Singh	Independent politician
1984	Mutum Deven	Independent politician
1990	Deven	Manipur Peoples Party
1995	Sorokhaibam Rajen Singh	Indian National Congress
2000	Sorokhaibam Rajen Singh	Manipur State Congress Party
2002	Wangkheimayum Brajabidhu	Indian National Congress
2007	Wangkheimayum Brajabidhu	Indian National Congress
2012	Wangkheimayum Brajabidhu	Indian National Congress
2017	Sorokhaibam Rajen Singh	Bharatiya Janata Party
2022	Sorokhaibam Rajen Singh	Bharatiya Janata Party

== Election results ==
Vote share of winning candidates
2022	47.80%
2017	44.93%
2012	40.23%
2007	53.67%
2002	54.80%
2000	34.18%
1995	22.13%
1990	32.02%
1984	43.21%
1980	19.20%
1974	25.44%
1972	27.87%

=== 2027 Assembly election ===
2027 Manipur Legislative Assembly election: Lamsang
Party	Candidate	Votes	%	±%
INC				
NDA				
NOTA	None of the above			
Majority				
Turnout				
gain from		Swing		

=== 2022 Assembly election ===
2022 Manipur Legislative Assembly election: Lamsang
Party	Candidate	Votes	%	±%
BJP	Sorokhaibam Rajen	15,185	47.80%	2.87%
NPP	Pukhrambam Sumati Devi	14,785	46.54%	
Independent	Arambam Karamjit Singh	733	2.31%	
JD(U)	Khundrakpamkanba Meitei	616	1.94%	
INC	Likmabam Manibabu Singh	241	0.76%	−39.60%
NOTA	Nota	210	0.66%	0.07%
Margin of victory		400	1.26%	−3.31%
Turnout		31,770	94.03%	1.43%
Registered electors		33,787		11.63%
BJP hold		Swing	2.87%	

=== 2017 Assembly election ===
2017 Manipur Legislative Assembly election: Lamsang
Party	Candidate	Votes	%	±%
BJP	Sorokhaibam Rajen	12,593	44.93%	43.81%
INC	Wangkheimayum Brajabidhu Singh	11,313	40.36%	0.13%
NEIDP	Phijam Pakchao Singh	3,956	14.11%	
NOTA	None of the Above	166	0.59%	
Margin of victory		1,280	4.57%	−8.02%
Turnout		28,028	92.60%	1.24%
Registered electors		30,267		10.68%
BJP gain from INC		Swing	4.70%	

=== 2012 Assembly election ===
2012 Manipur Legislative Assembly election: Lamsang
Party	Candidate	Votes	%	±%
INC	Wangkheimayum Brajabidhu Singh	10,053	40.23%	−13.44%
NCP	Sorokhaibam Rajen	6,909	27.65%	
CPI	Pakchao Phijam	6,500	26.01%	
MSCP	Khundrakpamkanba Meitei	736	2.95%	
AITC	Khoirom Raghumani Singh	418	1.67%	
BJP	Priyokumar Phijam	280	1.12%	
Margin of victory		3,144	12.58%	5.23%
Turnout		24,986	91.04%	0.01%
Registered electors		27,347		−0.43%
INC hold		Swing	-13.44%	

=== 2007 Assembly election ===
2007 Manipur Legislative Assembly election: Lamsang
Party	Candidate	Votes	%	±%
INC	Wangkheimayum Brajabidhu	13,468	53.67%	−1.13%
MPP	Sorokhaibam Rajen	11,624	46.33%	
Margin of victory		1,844	7.35%	−3.19%
Turnout		25,092	91.36%	0.27%
Registered electors		27,465		14.74%
INC hold		Swing	-1.13%	

=== 2002 Assembly election ===
2002 Manipur Legislative Assembly election: Lamsang
Party	Candidate	Votes	%	±%
INC	Wangkheimayum Brajabidhu Singh	11,859	54.80%	38.05%
FPM	Sorokhaibam Rajen	9,579	44.27%	42.33%
BJP	Thoudam Nabachandra Singh	155	0.72%	−32.66%
Margin of victory		2,280	10.54%	9.73%
Turnout		21,639	91.09%	−3.77%
Registered electors		23,936		7.98%
INC gain from MSCP		Swing	32.68%	

=== 2000 Assembly election ===
2000 Manipur Legislative Assembly election: Lamsang
Party	Candidate	Votes	%	±%
MSCP	Sorokhaibam Rajen	6,840	34.18%	
BJP	Wangkheimayum Brajabidhu Singh	6,678	33.37%	31.80%
INC	Khomdram Robindro Singh	3,353	16.76%	−5.37%
JD(U)	Arambam Kumar Singh	1,051	5.25%	
JD(S)	Phuritsabam Shyamo Singh	786	3.93%	
MPP	Anoubam Chidananda Sharma	644	3.22%	−9.27%
FPM	Waikhom Priyokumar Singh	388	1.94%	
Independent	Mongjam Guno	135	0.67%	
NCP	Thokchom Inaocha Singh	135	0.67%	
Margin of victory		162	0.81%	−0.92%
Turnout		20,010	91.16%	−3.70%
Registered electors		22,167		9.94%
MSCP gain from INC		Swing	12.06%	

=== 1995 Assembly election ===
1995 Manipur Legislative Assembly election: Lamsang
Party	Candidate	Votes	%	±%
INC	Sorokhaibam Rajen	4,184	22.13%	12.02%
Independent	Wangkheimayum Brajabidhu Singh	3,857	20.40%	
Independent	Phuritsabam Shyamo Singh	3,167	16.75%	
Independent	Dr. Haobam Borobabu Singh	2,849	15.07%	
MPP	Mutum Ruhini Devi	2,361	12.49%	−19.53%
CPI	Khungdongbam Jugeshor	2,049	10.84%	−6.11%
BJP	Thoudam Nabachandra Singh	297	1.57%	−10.04%
JD	R.K. Gambhir Singh	145	0.77%	
Margin of victory		327	1.73%	−0.97%
Turnout		18,909	94.86%	3.41%
Registered electors		20,163		7.67%
INC gain from MPP		Swing	-9.89%	

=== 1990 Assembly election ===
1990 Manipur Legislative Assembly election: Lamsang
Party	Candidate	Votes	%	±%
MPP	Deven	5,454	32.02%	
JD	Ph. Sagar Singh	4,995	29.33%	
CPI	H. Kwaklei	2,886	16.94%	−2.25%
BJP	N. Manihar	1,977	11.61%	
INC	Th. Manihar	1,721	10.10%	1.55%
Margin of victory		459	2.69%	−17.73%
Turnout		17,033	91.45%	2.02%
Registered electors		18,727		14.71%
MPP gain from Independent		Swing	-11.19%	

=== 1984 Assembly election ===
1984 Manipur Legislative Assembly election: Lamsang
Party	Candidate	Votes	%	±%
Independent	Mutum Deven	6,181	43.21%	
Independent	Phuritsabam Sagor	3,259	22.78%	
CPI	Khundongbam Jugeshwor	2,746	19.20%	0.57%
INC	Ningthoojam Manihar	1,224	8.56%	
Independent	Laishram Shamungou	895	6.26%	
Margin of victory		2,922	20.43%	19.86%
Turnout		14,305	89.43%	5.98%
Registered electors		16,325		9.63%
Independent hold		Swing	24.01%	

=== 1980 Assembly election ===
1980 Manipur Legislative Assembly election: Lamsang
Party	Candidate	Votes	%	±%
Independent	Phuritsabam Sagar Singh	2,329	19.20%	
CPI	Khundongbam Jugeshwar	2,260	18.63%	−6.81%
Independent	Maibam Angangjao	1,882	15.51%	
MPP	Chingangbam Kuber	1,582	13.04%	−12.39%
JP	Laishram Shamungou Singh	1,503	12.39%	
INC(I)	Th. Indra	1,400	11.54%	
INC(U)	A. K. Kullachandra	1,013	8.35%	
Independent	Hidangmayum Madhumangol	96	0.79%	
Independent	Thiyam Lal Singh	66	0.54%	
Margin of victory		69	0.57%	0.56%
Turnout		12,131	83.45%	−4.50%
Registered electors		14,891		21.07%
Independent gain from CPI		Swing	-6.24%	

=== 1974 Assembly election ===
1974 Manipur Legislative Assembly election: Lamsang
Party	Candidate	Votes	%	±%
CPI	Khundongbam Jugeswar	2,696	25.44%	−0.25%
MPP	Laisram Shamu Singh	2,695	25.43%	−2.44%
Independent	Haibam Angangjao	2,303	21.73%	
Independent	Ching Angbam Kupera	1,384	13.06%	
Independent	Ningthoujan Manihar	901	8.50%	
Independent	Longjam Thambou Singh	497	4.69%	
Independent	Thiyam Lal Singh	122	1.15%	
Margin of victory		1	0.01%	−2.17%
Turnout		10,598	87.95%	7.73%
Registered electors		12,300		28.30%
CPI gain from MPP		Swing	-2.43%	

=== 1972 Assembly election ===
1972 Manipur Legislative Assembly election: Lamsang
Party	Candidate	Votes	%	±%
MPP	Laishram Samungouba Singh	2,108	27.87%	
CPI	K. Jugeshwar	1,943	25.69%	
INC	Phuritsabam Sagar Singh	1,626	21.50%	
Independent	Ningthouja Manihar	945	12.50%	
Independent	Chongtham Achow	531	7.02%	
Independent	Samurailatpam Apabi	310	4.10%	
Independent	Thiyam Lala Singh	100	1.32%	
Margin of victory		165	2.18%	
Turnout		7,563	80.22%	
Registered electors		9,587		
MPP win (new seat)				

== See also ==
- List of constituencies of the Manipur Legislative Assembly
- Imphal West district
