= Sorokhaibam Rajen =

Indian politician

Member of the Manipur Legislative Assembly

Sorokhaibam Rajen Singh (born 1963) is an Indian politician from Manipur. He is a four-time member of the Manipur Legislative Assembly from Lamsang Assembly constituency in Imphal West district. He won the 2022 Manipur Legislative Assembly election, representing the Bharatiya Janata Party. He served as pro-tem speaker of the Manipur Legislative Assembly in March 2022.

== Early life and education ==
Rajen is from Salam Keikhu, Lamsang in Imphal West district, Manipur. He is the son of Sorokhaibam Yaimabi Singh. He married Taorem Shyama Devi, and they have two sons, Sorokhaibam Jayananda Singh and Sorokhaibam Rohit Singh, and a daughter, Sorokhaibam Bandana Devi. He completed his B.A. in 1988 at Y. K. College, Wangjing, which is affiliated with Manipur University.

== Career ==
Singh won from Lamsang Assembly constituency representing the Bharatiya Janata Party in the 2022 Manipur Legislative Assembly election. He polled 15,185 votes and defeated his nearest rival, Pukhrambam Sumati Devi of the National People's Party, by a margin of 400 votes. He first became an MLA winning the 1995 Manipur Legislative Assembly election representing the Indian National Congress. He defeated independent candidate Wangkheimayum Brajabidhu Singh by a margin of 327 votes. He retained the seat in the 2000 Manipur Legislative Assembly election but this time on Manipur State Congress Party ticket. However, he lost the next three elections in 2002, 2007 and 2012. He regained the seat winning the 2017 Manipur Legislative Assembly election representing the Bharatiya Janata Party. In 2017, he defeated his arch rival Wangkheimayum Brajabidhu Singh of the Indian National Congress again by a margin of 1,280 votes.
