= Khumukcham Joykisan =

Indian politician

Khumukcham Joykisan Singh

Member of Legislative Assembly, Manipur
- Incumbent
- Assumed office 15 March 2017
- Constituency: Thangmeiband

Personal details
- Party: BJP
- Other political affiliations: JD(U); INC; AITC

Khumukcham Joykisan Singh is an Indian politician and member of the Manipur Legislative Assembly representing Janata Dal (United). Later Khumukcham Joykisan Singh joined BJP on 2 September 2022.

Since the 2012 elections, he has been a member of Manipur Legislative Assembly from the Thangmeiband constituency in Imphal West district.
