= Moirang Assembly constituency =

Legislative Assembly constituency in Manipur State, India

Coordinates: 24.5°N 93.78°E

Moirang
- Constituency No. 27 for the Manipur Legislative Assembly

Constituency details
- Country: India
- Region: Northeast India
- State: Manipur
- District: Bishnupur
- Lok Sabha constituency: Inner Manipur
- Established: 1972
- Total electors: 39,876
- Reservation: None

Member of Legislative Assembly
- 12th Manipur Legislative Assembly
- Incumbent Thongam Shanti Singh
- Party: NPP
- Alliance: NDA
- Elected year: 2022

Moirang Legislative Assembly constituency is one of the 60 Legislative Assembly constituencies of Manipur state in India.

It is part of Bishnupur district.

== Extent ==
Moirang is the 27th among 60 constituencies of Manipur. It consists of 48 parts namely: 1 - Phubala (A), 2 - Phubala (B), 3 - Phubala (C), 4 - Phubala (D), 5 - Naranseina (A), 6 - Naranseina (B), 7 - Thamnapokpi (A), 8 - Thamnapokpi (B), 9 - Ngangkhalawai(A), 10 - Ngangkhalawai(B), 11 - Moirang Part 1(A), 12 - Moirang Part 1(B), 13 - Moirang Part 1 (C-1), 14 - Moirang Part 1 (C-2), 15 - Moirang Part 1 (D), 16 - Moirang Part 1 (E-1), 17 - Moirang Part 1 (E-2), 18 - Moirang Part 1 (F), 19 - Moirang Part 1 (G), 20 - Moirang Part 2 (A), 21 - Moirang Part 2 (B), 22 - Moirang Part 2 (C )-1, 23 - Moirang Part 2 (C )-2, 24 - Moirang Part 2 (D), 25 - Moirang Part 2 (E), 26 - Moirang Part 2 (F), 27 - Moirang Part 2 (G), 28 - Kwakta Khuman (A), 29 - Kwakta Khuman (B-1), 30 - Kwakta Khuman (B-2), 31 - Kwakta Khuman (C), 32 - Kwakta Khuman (D), 33 - Okshongbung, 34 - Tronglaobi (A)-1, 35 - Tronglaobi (A)-2, 36 - Tronglaobi (B), 37 - Terakhongshangbi(A), 38 - Terakhongshangbi(B), 39 - Kwakta 1 (A)-1, 40 - Kwakta 1 (A)-2, 41 - Kwakta 1 (B), 42 - Kwakta 1 (C), 43 - Kwakta Pangal Lamkhai Maning, 44 - Kwakta Pangal Lamkhai Mamang, 45 - Kwakta 1 (E), and 46 - Kwakta 1(F).

== Members of the Legislative Assembly ==
Year	Member	Party
1972	Heman Nilamani Singh	Independent politician
1974	Kiyam Shyam Singh	Indian National Congress
1980	Mairembam Koireng Singh	Janata Party
1984	M. Koireng Singh	Janata Party
1990	Mairembam Koireng Singh	Indian National Congress
1995	Mohammad Heshamuddin	Manipur Peoples Party
2000	Laishram Kerani Singh	Indian National Congress
2002	Salam Gopal Singh	Federal Party of Manipur
2007	M. Manindra	Indian National Congress
2012	Mairembam Prithviraj Singh	Indian National Congress
2017	Pukhrem Sharatchandra Singh	Bharatiya Janata Party
2022	Thongam Shanti Singh	National People's Party

== Election results ==
Vote share of winning candidates
2022	39.74%
2017	37.04%
2012	52.05%
2007	34.53%
2002	30.59%
2000	20.87%
1995	24.97%
1990	18.86%
1984	28.59%
1980	33.81%
1974	50.46%
1972	39.90%

=== 2027 Assembly election ===
2027 Manipur Legislative Assembly election: Moirang
Party	Candidate	Votes	%	±%
INC				
NDA				
NOTA	None of the above			
Majority				
Turnout				
gain from		Swing		

=== Assembly Election 2022 ===
2022 Manipur Legislative Assembly election: Moirang
Party	Candidate	Votes	%	±%
NPP	Thongam Shanti Singh	14,428	39.74%	
BJP	Mairembam Prithviraj Singh	12,206	33.62%	−3.42%
INC	Pukhrem Sharatchandra Singh	9,404	25.90%	−9.95%
NOTA	Nota	271	0.75%	0.10%
Margin of victory		2,222	6.12%	4.93%
Turnout		36,309	91.05%	1.66%
Registered electors		39,876		12.76%
NPP gain from BJP		Swing	2.70%	

=== Assembly Election 2017 ===
2017 Manipur Legislative Assembly election: Moirang
Party	Candidate	Votes	%	±%
BJP	Pukhrem Sharatchandra Singh	11,708	37.04%	
INC	Mairembam Prithviraj Singh	11,333	35.85%	−16.20%
Independent	Thongam Shanti Singh	8,369	26.47%	
NOTA	None of the Above	203	0.64%	
Margin of victory		375	1.19%	−2.96%
Turnout		31,613	89.39%	6.36%
Registered electors		35,364		5.24%
BJP gain from INC		Swing	-15.01%	

=== Assembly Election 2012 ===
2012 Manipur Legislative Assembly election: Moirang
Party	Candidate	Votes	%	±%
INC	Mairembam Prithviraj Singh	14,521	52.05%	17.52%
NCP	Pukhrem Sharatchandra Singh	13,363	47.90%	26.79%
Margin of victory		1,158	4.15%	0.54%
Turnout		27,900	82.98%	−0.65%
Registered electors		33,603		3.95%
INC hold		Swing	17.52%	

=== Assembly Election 2007 ===
2007 Manipur Legislative Assembly election: Moirang
Party	Candidate	Votes	%	±%
INC	M. Manindra	9,340	34.53%	13.49%
MPP	Salam Gopal Singh	8,364	30.92%	8.36%
NCP	Mohammad Heshamuddin	5,708	21.10%	
CPI	Nar Rahaman	2,068	7.65%	
RJD	Moirangthem Ashok Singh	1,564	5.78%	
Margin of victory		976	3.61%	−1.65%
Turnout		27,048	83.68%	−9.45%
Registered electors		32,325		14.62%
INC gain from FPM		Swing	3.94%	

=== Assembly Election 2002 ===
2002 Manipur Legislative Assembly election: Moirang
Party	Candidate	Votes	%	±%
FPM	Salam Gopal Singh	7,975	30.59%	11.22%
MSCP	Mohammad Abdul Matalib	6,604	25.33%	9.38%
MPP	Laishram Kerani Singh	5,881	22.56%	12.05%
INC	Mairembam Manindra Singh	5,485	21.04%	0.17%
Margin of victory		1,371	5.26%	3.76%
Turnout		26,067	93.12%	−0.22%
Registered electors		28,201		3.09%
FPM gain from INC		Swing	5.62%	

=== Assembly Election 2000 ===
2000 Manipur Legislative Assembly election: Moirang
Party	Candidate	Votes	%	±%
INC	Laishram Kerani Singh	5,140	20.87%	0.97%
FPM	Salam Gopal Singh	4,771	19.38%	
MSCP	Muhammad Heshamuddin	3,929	15.96%	
NCP	Mairembam Mani	2,691	10.93%	
MPP	Mohammad Abdul Matalib	2,589	10.51%	−14.46%
BJP	Mairembam Manindra Singh	2,019	8.20%	
SAP	Hemam Bir Singh	1,826	7.42%	
CPI	Soraisam Ibohal	1,630	6.62%	3.09%
Margin of victory		369	1.50%	−0.21%
Turnout		24,624	90.97%	−2.37%
Registered electors		27,357		12.91%
INC gain from MPP		Swing	-4.10%	

=== Assembly Election 1995 ===
1995 Manipur Legislative Assembly election: Moirang
Party	Candidate	Votes	%	±%
MPP	Mohammad Heshamuddin	5,586	24.97%	11.31%
Independent	Hemam Bir Singh	5,204	23.26%	
JD	Laishram Kerani Singh	5,109	22.84%	
INC	Mairembam Monindro	4,452	19.90%	1.04%
IC(S)	K. Deben	1,228	5.49%	
CPI	Moirangthem Panchom	790	3.53%	−2.76%
Margin of victory		382	1.71%	0.68%
Turnout		22,369	93.34%	7.73%
Registered electors		24,229		1.69%
MPP gain from INC		Swing	6.11%	

=== Assembly Election 1990 ===
1990 Manipur Legislative Assembly election: Moirang
Party	Candidate	Votes	%	±%
INC	Mairembam Koireng Singh	3,779	18.86%	4.54%
Independent	Hemam Bir Singh	3,574	17.84%	
JD	Laishram Kerani Singh	3,407	17.00%	
MPP	Mohammad Heshamuddin	2,738	13.67%	−14.76%
Independent	Mohammad Abdul Matalib	2,473	12.34%	
INS(SCS)	Konjengbam Deven	1,889	9.43%	
CPI	Konjengbam Mohonchandra	1,261	6.29%	−1.66%
NPP	Moirangthem Mangi Singh	915	4.57%	
Margin of victory		205	1.02%	0.86%
Turnout		20,036	85.61%	−0.76%
Registered electors		23,826		22.91%
INC gain from JP		Swing	-9.73%	

=== Assembly Election 1984 ===
1984 Manipur Legislative Assembly election: Moirang
Party	Candidate	Votes	%	±%
JP	M. Koireng Singh	4,660	28.59%	
MPP	Mohammad Heshamuddin	4,634	28.43%	10.13%
Independent	M. Mangi Singh	3,377	20.72%	
INC	Kiyam Shyam Singh	2,334	14.32%	
CPI	Konjengbam Mohonchandra	1,296	7.95%	−5.65%
Margin of victory		26	0.16%	−2.99%
Turnout		16,301	86.37%	4.24%
Registered electors		19,385		4.35%
JP hold		Swing	-5.22%	

=== Assembly Election 1980 ===
1980 Manipur Legislative Assembly election: Moirang
Party	Candidate	Votes	%	±%
JP	Mairembam Koireng Singh	5,052	33.81%	
JP(S)	Heman Nilamani Singh	4,582	30.66%	
MPP	Mohammad Abdul Matalib	2,734	18.30%	−30.65%
CPI	Moirangthem Kusha Singh	2,033	13.61%	
INC(I)	Moirangthem Mangi Singh	542	3.63%	
Margin of victory		470	3.15%	1.63%
Turnout		14,943	82.13%	−4.42%
Registered electors		18,577		27.08%
JP gain from INC		Swing	-16.65%	

=== Assembly Election 1974 ===
1974 Manipur Legislative Assembly election: Moirang
Party	Candidate	Votes	%	±%
INC	Kiyam Shyam Singh	6,268	50.46%	12.13%
MPP	Heman Nilamani Singh	6,080	48.95%	46.10%
Independent	Mongjam Krishana Singh	73	0.59%	
Margin of victory		188	1.51%	−0.06%
Turnout		12,421	86.55%	5.57%
Registered electors		14,618		51.80%
INC gain from Independent		Swing	10.56%	

=== Assembly Election 1972 ===
1972 Manipur Legislative Assembly election: Moirang
Party	Candidate	Votes	%	±%
Independent	Heman Nilamani Singh	3,076	39.90%	
INC	Kiyam Shyam Singh	2,955	38.33%	
CPI	Moirangthem Kusha Singh	1,458	18.91%	
MPP	Heman Angou	220	2.85%	
Margin of victory		121	1.57%	
Turnout		7,709	80.98%	
Registered electors		9,630		
Independent win (new seat)				

== See also ==
- List of constituencies of the Manipur Legislative Assembly
- Bishnupur district
