= Khurai (disambiguation) =

Khurai is a city in Madhya Pradesh, India.

Khurai may also refer to:

- Khurai, Madhya Pradesh Assembly constituency
- Khurai railway station, serving the city
- Khurai, Manipur Assembly constituency
