= Heikham Dingo Singh =

Indian politician

Member of the Manipur Legislative Assembly

Heikham Dingo Singh (born 1978) is an Indian politician from Manipur. He is an MLA from Sekmai Assembly constituency, which is reserved for Scheduled Castes, in Imphal West District. He won the 2022 Manipur Legislative Assembly election, representing the Bharatiya Janata Party.

== Early life and education ==
Singh is from Khurkhul Awang Mamang Leikei, Sekmai tehsil, Imphal West District, Manipur. He is the son of late Heikham Borajao Singh and Sharta Devi. He has two brothers, Linon Singla and Jhaljit Singla. He married Nandeibam Sita Devi and they have a son, Saneesh Heikham. He completed his bachelor's degree in Arts in 2014 at Presidency College, which is affiliated with Manipur University. His wife is a government employee with the Rural Development and Panchayat Raj department, Government of Manipur.

== Career ==
Singh won from Sekmai Assembly constituency representing the Bharatiya Janata Party in the 2022 Manipur Legislative Assembly election. He polled 10,010 votes and defeated his nearest rival, Ayangbam Oken Singh of the National People's Party, by a margin of 3,333 votes.
