= Nambol Assembly constituency =

Legislative Assembly constituency in Manipur State, India

Coordinates: 24.69°N 93.81°E

Nambol
- Constituency No. 24 for the Manipur Legislative Assembly

Constituency details
- Country: India
- Region: Northeast India
- State: Manipur
- District: Bishnupur
- Lok Sabha constituency: Inner Manipur
- Established: 1967
- Total electors: 33,399
- Reservation: None

Member of Legislative Assembly
- 12th Manipur Legislative Assembly
- Incumbent Thounaojam Basanta Kumar Singh
- Party: Bharatiya Janata Party
- Elected year: 2022

Nambol Legislative Assembly constituency is one of the 60 Legislative Assembly constituencies of Manipur state in India.

It is part of Bishnupur district.

== Extent ==
Nambol is the 24th among 60 constituencies of Manipur. It consists of 45 parts namely: 1 - Utlou (A), 2 - Utlou Mayai Leikai Mamang, 3 - Utlou (B), 4 - Utlou (C), 5 - Kakyai Langpok (A), 6 - Kakyai Langpok (B), 7 - Kakyai Langpok (C), 8 - Thiyam, 9 - Thiyam Awang, 10 - Lourembam, 11 - Pukhrabam Maning, 12 - Pukhrabam Mamang, 13 - Sanjenbam (A), 14 - Sanjenbam (B), 15 - Waheng Khuman (A), 16 - Waheng Khuman (B), 17 - Leimapokpam Makha Khunpham Mamang, 18 - Leimapokpam Khunpham, 19 - Leimapokpam Mayai Leikai (A), 20 - Leimapokpam Mayai Makha Leikai, 21 - Leimapokpam Awang Mamang, 22 - Leimapokpam Mayai Leikai (B), 23 - Khathong, 24 - Laitonjam, 25 - Phoijing Makha, 26 - Khori Leikai and Phoijing Tongba Kabui, 27 - Nambol Awang, 28 - Nambol Awang Makha, 29 - Nambol Makha, 30 - Kongkham (A-1), 31 - Kongkham (A-2), 32 - Senapati Sabal, 33 - Kongkham (B), 34 - Sabal Leikai Maning, 35 - Sabal Leikai Mamang, 36 - Balram Khul, 37 - Kabowakching Khunou, 38 - Kabowakching, 39 - Maibam Chingmang, 40 - Maibam Chingning, 41 - Naorem Utrapat (A), 42 - Naorem Utrapat (B), 43 - Ishok Awang Maning Leikai, 44 - Ishok Awang Leikai, and 45 - Ishok Mamang Maning Makha Leikai.

== Members of the Legislative Assembly ==
Year	Member	Party
1967	Y. Yaima	Independent politician
1972	Thounaojam Chaoba Singh	Manipur Peoples Party
1974	Thounaojam Chaoba Singh	Manipur Peoples Party
1980	Thounaojam Chaoba Singh	Janata Party
1984	Thounaojam Chaoba Singh	Indian National Congress
1990	Thounaojam Chaoba Singh	Indian National Congress
1995	Nameirakpam Loken Singh	Manipur Peoples Party
2000	Thounaojam Bira Singh	Manipur State Congress Party
2002	Nameirakpam Loken Singh	Indian National Congress
2007	Nameirakpam Loken Singh	Indian National Congress
2012	Nameirakpam Loken Singh	Indian National Congress
2017	Nameirakpam Loken Singh	Indian National Congress
2022	Thounaojam Basanta Kumar Singh	Bharatiya Janata Party

== Election results ==
Vote share of winning candidates
2022	54.76%
2017	50.28%
2012	51.29%
2007	52.03%
2002	46.02%
2000	40.95%
1995	35.91%
1990	48.90%
1984	32.34%
1980	34.00%
1974	50.19%
1972	53.02%
1967	45.70%

=== 2027 Assembly election ===
2027 Manipur Legislative Assembly election: Nambol
Party	Candidate	Votes	%	±%
INC				
NDA				
NOTA	None of the above			
Majority				
Turnout				
gain from		Swing		

=== Assembly Election 2022 ===
2022 Manipur Legislative Assembly election: Nambol
Party	Candidate	Votes	%	±%
BJP	Thounaojam Basanta Kumar Singh	16,885	54.76%	5.43%
INC	Nameirakpam Loken Singh	13,825	44.84%	−5.44%
Margin of victory		3,060	9.92%	8.97%
Turnout		30,834	92.32%	−1.94%
Registered electors		33,399		7.42%
BJP gain from INC		Swing	4.48%	

=== Assembly Election 2017 ===
2017 Manipur Legislative Assembly election: Nambol
Party	Candidate	Votes	%	±%
INC	Nameirakpam Loken Singh	14,736	50.28%	−1.01%
BJP	Thounaojam Chaoba Singh	14,456	49.33%	
Margin of victory		280	0.96%	−2.06%
Turnout		29,307	94.26%	2.40%
Registered electors		31,092		6.87%
INC hold		Swing	-1.01%	

=== Assembly Election 2012 ===
2012 Manipur Legislative Assembly election: Nambol
Party	Candidate	Votes	%	±%
INC	Nameirakpam Loken Singh	13,708	51.29%	−0.74%
MPP	Thounaojam Chaoba Singh	12,902	48.28%	2.65%
Margin of victory		806	3.02%	−3.39%
Turnout		26,724	91.83%	0.71%
Registered electors		29,094		4.95%
INC hold		Swing	-0.74%	

=== Assembly Election 2007 ===
2007 Manipur Legislative Assembly election: Nambol
Party	Candidate	Votes	%	±%
INC	Nameirakpam Loken Singh	13,147	52.03%	6.01%
MPP	Thounaojam Chaoba Singh	11,528	45.63%	
SP	Maibam Bijoy Singh	317	1.25%	
RJD	K. Kumarjit Singh	222	0.88%	
Margin of victory		1,619	6.41%	2.33%
Turnout		25,266	91.14%	−1.88%
Registered electors		27,721		11.23%
INC hold		Swing	6.01%	

=== Assembly Election 2002 ===
2002 Manipur Legislative Assembly election: Nambol
Party	Candidate	Votes	%	±%
INC	Nameirakpam Loken Singh	10,599	46.02%	35.10%
MSCP	Thounaojam Bira Singh	9,661	41.95%	1.00%
Manipur National Conference	Konjengbam Kumarjit Singh	2,769	12.02%	
Margin of victory		938	4.07%	−0.12%
Turnout		23,029	93.02%	−1.91%
Registered electors		24,922		6.15%
INC gain from MSCP		Swing	10.11%	

=== Assembly Election 2000 ===
2000 Manipur Legislative Assembly election: Nambol
Party	Candidate	Votes	%	±%
MSCP	Thounaojam Bira Singh	8,990	40.95%	
MPP	Nameirakpam Loken Singh	8,070	36.76%	0.84%
INC	Kongkham Jadumani Singh	2,398	10.92%	−22.52%
BJP	Saikhom Tikendra Singh	1,435	6.54%	−2.85%
NCP	Thounaojam Irabot Singh	1,062	4.84%	
Margin of victory		920	4.19%	1.72%
Turnout		21,955	94.48%	−0.45%
Registered electors		23,478		13.03%
MSCP gain from MPP		Swing	5.03%	

=== Assembly Election 1995 ===
1995 Manipur Legislative Assembly election: Nambol
Party	Candidate	Votes	%	±%
MPP	Nameirakpam Loken Singh	7,003	35.91%	12.59%
INC	Thounaojam Chaoba Singh	6,521	33.44%	−15.46%
JD	Kongkham Jadumani Singh	3,129	16.05%	
BJP	Saikhom Tikendra Singh	1,831	9.39%	
CPI	Toijam Ibemhal	1,015	5.21%	
Margin of victory		482	2.47%	−18.86%
Turnout		19,499	94.93%	1.51%
Registered electors		20,771		7.26%
MPP gain from INC		Swing	-12.99%	

=== Assembly Election 1990 ===
1990 Manipur Legislative Assembly election: Nambol
Party	Candidate	Votes	%	±%
INC	Thounaojam Chaoba Singh	8,759	48.90%	16.56%
INS(SCS)	Hidangmayum Shyakishor Sharma	4,939	27.58%	
MPP	Nameirakpam Chandreshwor Singh	4,177	23.32%	−0.92%
Margin of victory		3,820	21.33%	21.03%
Turnout		17,911	93.42%	−0.71%
Registered electors		19,365		17.41%
INC hold		Swing	16.56%	

=== Assembly Election 1984 ===
1984 Manipur Legislative Assembly election: Nambol
Party	Candidate	Votes	%	±%
INC	Thounaojam Chaoba Singh	4,916	32.34%	
Independent	Hidangmayum Shyakishor Sharma	4,870	32.04%	
MPP	Nameirakpam Chandreshwor Singh	3,685	24.24%	
Independent	Rajkumar Bhubonsana	1,729	11.38%	
Margin of victory		46	0.30%	−0.95%
Turnout		15,200	94.13%	2.78%
Registered electors		16,494		6.99%
INC gain from JP		Swing	-1.65%	

=== Assembly Election 1980 ===
1980 Manipur Legislative Assembly election: Nambol
Party	Candidate	Votes	%	±%
JP	Thounaojam Chaoba Singh	4,678	34.00%	
INC(I)	Hidangmayum Shyakishor Sharma	4,506	32.75%	
Independent	Nameirakpam Chandreshwor Singh	4,215	30.63%	
Independent	Thounaujam Achou	226	1.64%	
INC(U)	Loitonghbam Herando	135	0.98%	
Margin of victory		172	1.25%	0.87%
Turnout		13,760	91.34%	−0.57%
Registered electors		15,417		28.46%
JP gain from MPP		Swing	-16.19%	

=== Assembly Election 1974 ===
1974 Manipur Legislative Assembly election: Nambol
Party	Candidate	Votes	%	±%
MPP	Thounaojam Chaoba Singh	5,396	50.19%	−2.83%
INC	Hidangmayum Shyakishor Sharma	5,355	49.81%	2.83%
Margin of victory		41	0.38%	−5.67%
Turnout		10,751	91.91%	6.63%
Registered electors		12,001		6.74%
MPP hold		Swing	-2.83%	

=== Assembly Election 1972 ===
1972 Manipur Legislative Assembly election: Nambol
Party	Candidate	Votes	%	±%
MPP	Thounaojam Chaoba Singh	5,007	53.02%	
INC	Hidangmayum Shyakishor Sharma	4,436	46.98%	18.79%
Margin of victory		571	6.05%	−11.46%
Turnout		9,443	85.28%	3.14%
Registered electors		11,243		−32.94%
MPP gain from Independent		Swing	7.33%	

=== Assembly Election 1967 ===
1967 Manipur Legislative Assembly election: Nambol
Party	Candidate	Votes	%	±%
Independent	Y. Yaima	6,084	45.70%	
INC	S. Sharma	3,753	28.19%	
CPI	K. Keitombi	2,135	16.04%	
Independent	O. L. Roton	757	5.69%	
Independent	A. Angahal	585	4.39%	
Margin of victory		2,331	17.51%	
Turnout		13,314	82.14%	
Registered electors		16,765		
Independent win (new seat)				

== See also ==
- List of constituencies of the Manipur Legislative Assembly
- Bishnupur district
