= Imphal district =

- District of Manipur
- Interactive map of Imphal district
- Coordinates: 24°48′N 93°57′E
- Country: India
- State: Manipur

Area
  - Total: 1,229 km^{2} (475 sq mi)
- Time zone: UTC+05:30 (IST)

Imphal district was a district in the state of Manipur in India. In 1997, it was split into Imphal East district with its seat in the city of Porompat, and Imphal West district, whose seat is Lamphelpat.
