= Bimol Akoijam =

Indian academic and politician

Member of Parliament, Lok Sabha
- Incumbent
- Assumed office 4 June 2024
- Preceded by: Rajkumar Ranjan Singh
- Constituency: Inner Manipur

Personal details
- Party: Indian National Congress
- Profession: Associate Professor at the JNU (before terminated for sexual harassment allegations)

Angomcha Bimol Akoijam is an Indian filmmaker, politician and public intellectual. He was elected to the 18th Lok Sabha from the Inner Manipur constituency in Manipur in the 2024 Indian general election as a member of the Indian National Congress. Previously he was an associate professor at the Jawaharlal Nehru University's School of Social Sciences, before being sacked following sexual harassment accusations from several students.

== Early life ==
Akoijam belongs to the Meitei community, of Manipur. He was born c. 1967. He has received an MA and PhD in psychology. His specialisation is stated to be social and political psychology and cultural studies.

== Academic career ==
Akoijam taught at Delhi University and the Centre for the Study of Developing Societies (CSDS). Until 2026 he was an associate professor at the Jawaharlal Nehru University (JNU).

Akoijam is said to be a keen explorer of cinema, and served as a jury member in film festivals. He made a documentary Lang-Goi Challabee (Paradise Under Siege) in 2004, and the feature film Karigee Kirunee Nungsiradee (Why Be Afraid, If You Love) in 2014.

According to Scopus database, Bimol Akoijam has 1 publication and zero citation. However, there are a few publications by Akoijam on Google Scholar.

=== Public intellectual ===
According to NDTV News, Akoijam has long been involved in public issues and democratic movements. He is often seen in the media speaking about issues related to rights and governance.

During the ethnic violence in the state of Manipur between the majority Meitei community of Manipur and the Kuki-Zo tribals, he was very vocal against the way the conflict was handled by the central and state governments.

But he was often heard absolving the state government and chief minister, claiming that he was being held as a "scapegoat".

He has held the Indian Army and Assam Rifles accountable, saying that they were seen as being hand-in-glove with the "Kuki militant groups", and that they need to win back the trust of the Meitei people. He has also blamed the national media of India, saying they were biased against the Meitei community, and led a research study that claimed to document such bias.

== Political career ==
Akoijam entered politics after witnessing the ethnic violence in the state of Manipur. He had become well known in Manipur for being one of the few academics to raise concerns about ethnic tensions and issues of rights and governance since the conflict began.

He was elected as the candidate of the Indian National Congress from Inner Manipur in the 2024 Indian general election. He also had the joint approval and backing of the ten parties in the INC-led alliance in Manipur. Akoijam Bimol won the Lok Sabha seat from Inner Manipur seat with a majority of 1,09,801 votes, breaking electoral records set in Manipur.

== Sexual harassment accusations ==
In May 2026, a complaint of sexual harassment in the form of inappropriate remarks and alleged advances at gatherings by 11 students was reportedly submitted at the Internal Complaints Committee (ICC) of JNU against Akoijam. In September 2026, this was followed by protests by the BJP-RSS linked Akhil Bharatiya Vidyarthi Parishad (ABVP) against him and Delhi Commission for Women seeking a report from JNU on action taken against him. He has denied the allegations and alleged that the manner the media was reporting was a "media trial" which was unethical and intentional Subsequent to the investigation, the university's Internal Committee (IC) recommended "major punishment" against him, and he was dismissed on 9 October 2026 with immediate effect from Jawaharlal Nehru University.

Later, Delhi Police lodged a FIR against Akoijam on the behest of the Chief Security Officer of the JNU. Akoijam was charged under sections 75, 75(1)(i), 75(1)(iv), and 79 of the Bharatiya Nyaya Sanhita (BNS), 2023.
