= Pheiroijam Parijat Singh =

Indian politician

Pheiroijam Parijat Singh (7 June 1943 – 6 March 2015) was an Indian politician from Manipur, belonging to the Communist Party of India. He was a National Council member of CPI. He had joined CPI in 1964.

He was the Health Minister in the state government. In 2007 he was elected to the Legislative Assembly of Manipur, as the CPI candidate in the Lamlai constituency. He had been Food and Civil Supplies Minister after the 2002 election. He had been elected from the same Assembly seat in the 2002, 1990 and 1980 elections, finishing second in the 2000, 1995 and 1984 elections.
