= N. Tombi Singh =

Indian politician (1927–2001)

N. Tombi Singh (2 February 1927 – 6 May 2001) was an Indian politician from Manipur who was a member of Lok Sabha for the Inner Manipur constituency.

== Life and career ==
Singh was born at Uripok, Imphal District, Manipur, British India on 2 February 1927. He was elected to the 5th, 6th, 8th and 9th Lok Sabha for Inner Manipur.

== Death ==
Singh died after a brief illness in Imphal, Manipur, on 6 May 2001, at the age of 74.
