= 2021–22 NEROCA FC season =

2021–22 football season for NEROCA Football Club

NEROCA
2021–22 season
- Head coach: Khogen Singh
- AIFF Super Cup: Pre season

The 2021–22 season was the 56th season of NEROCA FC in existence and Fifth season in the I-League NEROCA were relegated after finishing 11th in the previous season, but were reinstated by AIFF after viewing the situation of the COVID-19 pandemic.

== Senior Team Squad ==
As of 7 July 2021

Note: Flags indicate national team as defined under FIFA eligibility rules; some limited exceptions apply. Players may hold more than one non-FIFA nationality.

No.	Pos.	Nation	Player
3	DF	IND	Jonathan Cardozo
4	DF	IND	Longjam Gobin
5	DF	BRA	Danilo Quipapá
6	MF	IND	Romtan Singh
7	MF	IND	Khaimithang Lhungdim
8	MF	IND	Yumkhaibam Jiteshwor Singh
9	FW	ESP	Sergio Mendigutxia
10	MF	ESP	Juan Mera
12	MF	IND	Benjamin Lupheng
15	MF	IND	Vicky Meitei
16	DF	IND	Madan Saiprasad Ghogale
17	FW	LBN	Mohamad Kdouh
18	FW	IND	Sweden Fernandes (On loan from Hyderabad FC)
19	MF	IND	Ayush Kumar Singh
20	DF	IND	Mohammad Abdul Salam

No.	Pos.	Nation	Player
22	MF	IND	Hrishikesh Namboothiri
23	DF	IND	Kongbrailatpam Manjit Sharma
24	DF	IND	Saikhom Thomas
25	DF	IND	Lamjingba Mutum
26	GK	IND	Prateek Kumar Singh
28	DF	IND	Rishan Ahanthem
29	MF	IND	Pukhrambam Manisana
30	MF	IND	Lungunhao Sithou
33	DF	IND	Seikhohao Haokip
—	FW	IND	Nikhil Sharan
—	MF	IND	Gerald Barretto
—	GK	IND	Shubham Dhas
—	GK	IND	Golmei Dihempu Rongmei
—	FW	IND	Khundom Lucky
—	MF	IND	Y Sonam Chothe
—	DF	IND	Wangkheimayum Olen

=== New and extended contracts ===
Date	Position	Nationality	Name	Ref.
25 June 2021	MF	(India)	Benjamin Lupheng	
3 July 2021	DF	(India)	Kongbrailatpam Manjit Sharma	
9 July 2021	MF	(India)	Khaimithang Lhungdim	
11 July 2021	MF	(India)	Yumkhaibam Jiteshwor Singh	
15 July 2021	DF	(India)	Romtan Singh	

== Transfers ==
=== Transfers in ===
Date	Position	Nationality	Name	From	Fee	Ref.
16 June 2021	DF	(India)	Jonathan Cardozo	(India) FC Goa Reserves	None	
22 June 2021	MF	(India)	Vicky Meitei	(India) TRAU	None	
23 June 2021	DF	(India)	Mohammad Abdul salam	(India) TRAU	None	
23 June 2021	GK	(India)	Prateek Kumar Singh	(India) Chennai City	None	
23 June 2021	MF	(India)	Pukhrambam Manisana	(India) Jamshedpur FC	None	
7 August 2021	MF	(India)	Hrishikesh Namboothiri	Delhi Trials	None	
7 August 2021	DF	(India)	Madan Saiprasad Ghogale	Delhi Trials	None	
7 August 2021	DF	(India)	Ayush Kumar Singh	Delhi Trials	None	
8 August 2021	MF	(Spain)	Juan Mera	(Spain) Lealtad	None	
15 August 2021	FW	(Lebanon)	Mohamad Kdouh	(Lebanon) Racing Beirut	None	
24 August 2021	FW	(India)	Nikhil Sharan	Chennai Trials	None	
25 August 2021	DF	(India)	Inban Udhyanidhi	Chennai Trials	None	
26 August 2021	DF	(India)	Lallenmang Sitihou	(India) Sagolband United	None	
26 August 2021	DF	(Brazil)	Danilo Quipapá	(India) Punjab	None	
27 August 2021	DF	(India)	Gerrald Barretto	Chennai Trials	None	
29 August 2021	FW	(Spain)	Sergio Mendigutxia	(Spain) Marino de Luanco	None	
31 August 2021	GK	(India)	Shubham Dhas	(India) Goa	None	

=== Loans in ===
Date from	Position	Nationality	Name	From	Date until	Ref.
28 June 2021	FW	(India)	Sweden Fernandes	(India) Hyderabad FC	None	

=== Transfers out ===
Date	Position	Nationality	Name	To	Fee	Ref.
3 July 2021	DF	(India)	Takhellambam Deepak	(India) Gokulam Kerala	None	
5 July 2021	FW	(India)	Khanngnam Horam	(India) TRAU	None	
16 July 2021	DF	(India)	Shoaib Akhtar	(India) Gokulam Kerala	None	
23 July 2021	DF	(India)	Akbar Khan	(India) Gokulam Kerala	None	
23 July 2021	DF	(Liberia)	Varney Kallon	(India) Calcutta Customs	None	
23 July 2021	MF	(Trinidad and Tobago)	Nathaniel García		None	
23 July 2021	FW	(Trinidad and Tobago)	Judah García	(Greece) AEK Athens B	None	
23 July 2021	MF	(Nepal)	Prakash Budhathoki	(Nepal) Friends Club		
1 September 2021	GK	(India)	Loitongbam Bishorjit Singh	(India) Kenkre FC	None	
7 September 2021	MF	(India)	Songpu Singsit	(India) East Bengal	None	

== Current technical staff ==
Position	Name
Head coach	(India) Khogen Singh
Asst. head coach	(India) Sapam Premkanta Singh
Secretary	(India) Leimapokpam
Goalkeeping coach	(India) Sapam Premkanta Singh
Team manager	(India) Laishram Rajiv Singh
Physio	(India) Kshterimayum Karan Singh
Kit manager	(India) Lairellakpam Shobha Singh

== Pre-season ==
16 October 2021 Friendly	NEROCA	1-1	TRAU	Imphal
16.00 IST				Stadium: Khuman Lampak Main Stadium

== Competitions ==
Win Draw Loss

Competition	Starting round	Final position	Record							
Competition	Starting round	Final position	Pld	W	D	L	GF	GA	GD	Win %
I-League	Matchday 1		0	0	0	0	0	0	+0	—
Super Cup			0	0	0	0	0	0	+0	—
		0					—			
Total			0	0	0	0	0	0	+0	—

Source: Competitions

=== I-League ===
==== League table ====
Pos	Team	Pld	W	D	L	GF	GA	GD	Pts	Qualification
4	Sreenidi Deccan	12	6	3	3	18	14	+4	21	Championship stage
5	Churchill Brothers	12	6	2	4	16	15	+1	20	Championship stage
6	NEROCA	12	4	6	2	17	16	+1	18	Championship stage
7	Rajasthan United	12	3	7	2	10	8	+2	16	Championship stage
8	Real Kashmir	12	2	7	3	18	22	−4	13	Relegation stage

Source: Hero I-League
Rules for classification: 1) points; 2) head-to-head points; 3) head-to-head goal difference; 4) goal difference; 5) number of goals scored; 6) drawing of lots
