= 2021 Manipur State League =

14th season of the Manipur Super League

Manipur State League
- Season: 2020–21
- Dates: 22 March 2021 – 29 April 2021; 24 January 2022 - 3 February 2022
- Champions: KLASA (1st title)
- Matches: 40
- Longest winning run: NISA (3 games)

The 2021 Manipur State League was the 14th season of the Manipur State League, the top-division football league in the Indian state of Manipur.The league began on 22 March 2021 and was postponed on 19 April 2021 due to Corona virus pandemic.

A total number of 17 teams participated in the league. Teams were divided into two groups A and B. The remaining matches were first postponed by the AMFA amidst the pandemic following the guidelines. All the remaining matches will be resumed in the first week of October.

== Teams ==
=== Group A ===
Club	City/Town
DM Rao	Sekmai
Ganggam SC	
KIYC	Kshetri
KLASA	Keinou
NEROCA FC	Imphal
Sagolband United	
Southern Sporting Union	Singjamei
TRAU FC	Imphal
Yarkhok United FC	Ukhrul

=== Group B ===
Club	City/Town
AFC	Thoubal
AIM	Khabm Lamkhai
NACO	Nambul Mapal
NISA	Thangmeiband
Manipur Police SC	
Muvanlai Athletics	
United Khawzim Brothers	
Young Physique’s Union (YPHU)	

== Group stage ==
=== Group A ===
Pos	Team	Pld	W	D	L	GF	GA	GD	Pts
1	KLASA	8	6	1	1	18	6	+12	19
2	Sagolband United	8	4	3	1	19	5	+14	15
3	SSU	8	3	5	0	14	8	+6	14
4	KIYC	8	4	2	2	13	11	+2	14
5	Gunggam SC	8	4	1	3	18	18	0	13
6	NEROCA	8	3	1	4	14	14	0	10
7	TRAU	8	2	1	5	8	14	-6	7
8	Yarkhok United	8	1	2	5	15	16	-1	5
9	DM Rao	8	1	0	7	7	34	-27	3

=== Group B ===
Pos	Team	Pld	W	D	L	GF	GA	GD	Pts
1	AFC Thoubal	7	5	0	2	19	12	+7	15
2	United Khawzim Brothers	7	4	1	2	18	14	+4	13
3	Muvanlai Athletics	7	4	0	3	11	9	+2	12
4	AIM	7	4	0	3	12	15	-3	12
5	YPHU	7	3	0	4	12	8	+4	9
6	NISA	7	3	0	4	10	8	2	9
7	Manipur Police SC	7	3	0	4	13	14	-1	9
8	NACO	7	1	1	5	3	18	-15	4

== Knockout stage ==
=== Bracket ===
Quarter-finals
KLASA	2
Muvanlai	0
Sagolband United	6
AIM	0
AFC	1 (5)
SSU (p)	1 (6)
United Khawzim	2
KIYC	0

Semi-finals
KLASA	2
Sagolband United	1
SSU	1
United Khawzim	0

Final
KLASA	1
SSU	0

=== Quarter-finals ===
24 January 2022	KLASA, Keinou	2–0	Muvanlai Athletics

24 January 2022	AFC, Thoubal	1–1 (5–6 p)	SSU, Singjamei

25 January 2022	Sagolband United	6–0	AIM, Khabam Lamkhai

25 January 2022	United Khawzim Brothers	2–0	KIYC, Kshetri

=== Semi-finals ===
28 January 2022	KLASA, Keinou	2–1	Sagolband United

28 January 2022	SSU, Singjamei	1–0	United Khawzim Brothers

=== Final ===
3 February 2022	KLASA, Keinou	1–0	SSU, Singjamei

== See also ==
- 2021–22 season in state football leagues of India
  - 2021–22 Calcutta Premier Division
  - 2021 Bihar State Soccer League
