= Okram =

Okram is a Meitei family name. Notable people with this surname are:

- Okram Ibobi Singh, Indian politician and former chief minister of Manipur
- Okram Bikram Singh, Indian male track cyclist
- Okram Henry Singh, Indian politician
- Okram Roshini Devi, Indian women footballer
- Surjakumar Okram, Indian politician
