= Manipur State League =

- Organising body: All Manipur Football Association
- Founded: 2006; 20 years ago
- Country: India
- Number of clubs: 17
- Domestic cup: Churachand Singh Trophy
- Current champions: KLASA (2nd title)
- Most championships: NISA (5 titles)
- Broadcaster(s): Impact TV (YouTube)
- Current: 2025–26

The Manipur State League is a state-level football league in Manipur, India. It has been organised since 2006 by the All Manipur Football Association. It was the highest state league until the 2022–23 season, when the champions of Manipur Premier League was given the spot for promotion to I-League 3.

== History ==
The league is a 17-team affair which is usually played on a home-and-away format over a period of several months. NISA from Thangmeiband have won MSL four times, and Tiddim Road Athletic Union won two times.

== League structure ==
- Until 2022–23 season

Tier	Division
1 _{(5 on Indian football Pyramid)}	Manipur State League
2 _{(6 on Indian football pyramid)}	AMFA Cup
3 _{(7 on Indian football pyramid)}	AMFA Winners' Cup (Thangjam Birchandra-Maipakpi Memorial Winners' Cup)
4 _{(8 on Indian football pyramid)}	District leagues

== Teams ==
=== 2025–26 season ===
Team	Location
Eastern Sporting Union (ESU)	Imphal
United Sports Association (USA)	Khurai, Imphal East
North Eastern Sporting Union (NESU)	Khurai, Imphal East
FC Raengdai	Noney
Youth Organisation Sporting Club (YOSC)	Khurai, Imphal East
Rahee United Club	Kamjong
Nambul Mapal Athletic & Cultural Organisation (NACO)	Nambul Mapal, Imphal West
XI Star Sporting Union	Akampat, Imphal
NMFA	Salam, Imphal West
TRAU	Imphal
Milan FA	Keibi, Imphal East
Youth Development Organisation (YDO)	Konjeng Leikai, Imphal
Imphal FA	Lamphelpat, Imphal West
UPAA	Kyamgei, Imphal West
FC Kumbi	Moirang, Bishnupur
Social Development Club	Samurou, Imphal West
NEROCA	Imphal
Sainik FC	Sagolband, Imphal West
TRUGPU	Nambol, Bishnupur
Manipur Police SC	Imphal
Pathap FC	Thoubal
Utlou FC	Utlou, Bishnupur
Elite FA	Porompat, Imphal East
FC Lamjao	Lamjao, Kakching

== Prize money ==
Prize money for 10th Manipur State League:

	Purse
Champions	₹2 lakh (US$2,412)
Runners-up	₹1.5 lakh (US$1,809)
Top scorer	₹20,000 (US$210)

== Champions ==
Ed.	Years	Winner	Note
1st	2006	TRAU, Kwakeithel	
2nd	2007	NISA, Thangmeiband	
3rd	2008	NISA, Thangmeiband	
4th	2009	NISA, Thangmeiband	
5th	2010	TRAU, Kwakeithel	
6th	2011	NISA, Thangmeiband	
7th	2012	Southern Sporting Union, Singjamei	
8th	2013	NISA, Thangmeiband	
9th	2014	NEROCA, Sangakpham	
10th	2015	Anouba Imagi Mangal, Khabam Lamkhai	
11th	2016	NEROCA, Sangakpham	
12th	2017	League abandoned	
13th	2019	League abandoned	
14th	2021	KLASA, Keinou	
15th	2022–23	KLASA, Keinou	
16th	2023–24	NISA, Thangmeiband	
17th	2024–25	Young Physique’s Union, Lalambung	
18th	2025–26		

== Player awards ==
=== Top scorer ===
Season	Player	Club	Goals
2015	(Nigeria) Offor Emeka Christian	NEROCA F.C.	10

=== Best player ===
Season	Player	Club
2015	(India) Seikhohau Tuboi	F.C. Zalen

=== Fair play trophy ===
Season	Club
2015	Anouba Imagi Mangal
