= North Imphal Sporting Association =

Indian association football club

- Full name: North Imphal Sporting Association
- Short name: NISA
- Founded: 2006; 20 years ago (refounded)
- Ground: Thangmeiband Athletic Union Ground (THAU Ground); Turf Ground Khuman Lampak, Imphal
- Capacity: 10,000; 5,000
- Head coach: Maibam Romi
- League: Manipur State League
Home colours	Away colours

North Imphal Sporting Association, commonly known as NISA Manipur, is an Indian professional football club based in Thangmeiband, Manipur. NISA is five-time champions of the Manipur State League, which is a project under the Vision Asia program by the Asian Football Confederation (AFC). They have also participated in the I-League 2nd Division, then second tier of Indian football league system.

== History ==
=== Formation and journey ===
North Imphal Sporting Association was originally founded during the 1950s and was revived in 2006. The club is affiliated with the All Manipur Football Association (AMFA). NISA has been participating in the prestigious Manipur State Football League since its inauguration in 2006 and lifted the trophy on three occasions. After winning the state league in the 2009–10 season, they qualified for the 2nd Division of the I-League, then top flight of Football in India.

NISA lifted prestigious Churachand Singh Invitation Trophy in 2007, defeating AMOFA Moirang, 2–0. They are also two time runners-up in the tournament during its 1969 and 1994 edition. In 2008, the club participated in E. K. Nayanar Gold Cup, faced Nigerian side Bayelsa and Argentine club Buenos Aires De Futbal in group stages. In the 2010 I-League 2nd Division, NISA started by winning four of six matches and secured a berth to the I-League qualification playoffs with 15 points. However, they failed to qualify for the 2010–11 I-League after a heartbreaking bottom finish without a single win.

=== 2011 season ===
The team again participated in the I-League 2nd Division of the 2011 season. They were in group A with United Sikkim FC, Gauhati Town Club, Southern Samity, Langsning FC, Simla Youngs FC, and Golden Threads FC.

NISA opened the 2011 I-League 2nd Division with a 3–1 win over Golden Threads FC. NabaChnadra scored 2 goals and N Rakesh scored one. NISA beat Shimla Youngs 3–0. They finished their group A qualifying with 9 points and didn't qualify for final round. Their striker L. Nabachandra emerged as top scorer for the club with three goals.

The defending champion North Imphal Sporting Association Thangmeiband retained themselves as the champions in the prestigious Manipur State League in its sixth edition.

=== Later years ===
NISA again lifted Manipur State League title in 2013, defeating SSU Singjamei through penalty-shootout. The club also participated in Kohima Royal Gold Cup in Nagaland.

In 2019, NISA participated in Bodousa Cup in Assam and finished on third place. In that competition, they were given Fair Play Award.

Due to the COVID-19 pandemic in India pandemic, Manipur State League was cancelled in 2020 and again in April 2021, but came back in October, in which NISA was in Group B but failed to reach the knock-out stages.

== Home grounds ==
=== Current venue ===
NISA Manipur is currently using Thangmeiband Athletic Union Ground (commonly known as THAU Ground) as their home stadium. Built in 2006, the ground is located in Thangmeiband, Imphal, and has a capacity of 5000 spectators.

=== Former venue ===
Khuman Lampak Main Stadium in Imphal, Manipur, was used as the home ground of NISA for their home matches in both the domestic and regional leagues. Opened in 1999, the stadium is owned by All Manipur Football Association and has a capacity of 35,285 spectators.

== Rivalry ==
NISA has a strong rivalry with its fellow Manipuri clubs NEROCA FC and TRAU FC. This rivalry is visible highly during the Manipur State League every season. Until 2018, NISA has enjoyed the taste of these rivalries in the I-League 2nd Division.

== Past internationals ==
- The player(s) below had senior international cap(s) for their respective countries. Players whose name is listed, represented their countries before or after playing for NISA Manipur.
- (Grenada) Marcus Julien (2011–2013) (Note: In 2011, Grenadian international Marcus Julien moved to India and signed a contract with North Imphal Sporting Association (NISA Manipur), which was newly promoted to the I-League 2nd Division after winning the Manipur State League in 2010. Julien has appeared in the league where they were in group A with United Sikkim FC, Gauhati Town Club, Southern Samity, Langsning FC, Simla Youngs FC, and Golden Threads FC. He scored his first goal in a 3–0 win match against Simla Youngs. They finished their campaign with 9 points and didn't qualify for the final round (Play-offs). Between 2011 and 2012, he appeared in 25 times in both the leagues and he was also in the squad as the defending champion NISA of Thangmeiband, retained themselves as the champions in the 6th Manipur State League in 2011. He scored a total of 18 goals before moving to his previous club Eagles Super Strikers.)

== Honours ==
=== Football ===
League

- Manipur State League
  - Champions (7): 2007, 2008, 2009, 2011, 2013, 2023–24
  - Runners-up (1): 2012

Cup

- Churachand Singh Trophy
  - Champions (1): 2007
  - Runners-up (2): 1969, 1994
- Mayanglambam Chittamani Memorial Winners Cup
  - Runners-up (1): 2002
- All India Independence Day Cup
  - Runners-up (1): 2009
- Jiri Invitational Cup
  - Runners-up (1): 2015–16

=== Futsal ===
- AMFA Futsal Cup
  - Runners-up (1): 2007

=== Awards ===
- Bodousa Cup Fair Play Award: 2019

== See also ==
- Football in India
- List of football clubs in Manipur
- Sports in Manipur
