= NEROCA FC =

Association football club in Manipur, India

NEROCA
- Full name: North Eastern Re-Organising Cultural Association Football Club
- Nickname: The Orange Brigade
- Founded: 1965; 61 years ago
- Ground: Khuman Lampak Main Stadium
- Capacity: 35,285
- Owner: North Eastern Re-Organising Cultural Association (NEROCA)
- Chairman: Thangjam Arunkumar
- Head coach: Yumnam Raju
- League: Manipur State League; I-League 3
Home colours	Away colours

NEROCA Football Club (known fully as North Eastern Re-Organising Cultural Association Football Club) is an Indian professional football club based in Imphal, Manipur, that currently competes in the I-League 3. It previously competed in the I-League, the second tier of the Indian football league system. Founded in 1965 and nicknamed "The Orange Brigade", the club made their I-League 2nd Division debut in the 2015–16 season. Winning the 2016–17 league, they secured promotion to the I-League. NEROCA is the first club from Northeast India to reach the final of the coveted Durand Cup. The club also competes in the Manipur State League.

== History ==
=== Formation and early years ===
North Eastern Re-Organising Cultural Association (abbreviated as NEROCA) was established in 1965, with the hope of improving quality in the field of cultural activities and sports in the Indian state of Manipur. It was registered under the Manipur State co-operative Society Registration Act bearing registration No. 1016 of 1972. NEROCA is a registered football club of the Imphal East District Football Association, and affiliated with All Manipur Football Association (AMFA). NEROCA has participated in every edition of the Manipur State League since its inception. The club has a record of second-place finish for the first time in the 2007 edition. The club is also a regular participant of Sir Churachand Singh Memorial Football Tournament.

=== 2014–present ===
In the 9th season of Manipur State League (2014), NEROCA won championship trophy. The club as per norms of the All India Football Federation (AIFF), changed the nomenclature from "NEROCA" to "NEROCA Football Club Imphal", aiming to join I-League 2nd Division. NEROCA then went on to compete in the 2015–16 and 2016–17 I-League 2nd Division seasons. They emerged as champions of the 2016–17 season with 26 points in 10 matches from the final round, and qualified for the 2017–18 season of the I-League. They also clinched the title of Manipur State League in 2016.

The biggest achievement of NEROCA is emerging as the runners-up in the 2017–18 I-League. Under the coaching of Gift Raikhan, they finished campaign with 32 points from 18 matches. In that season, NEROCA brought Vector X as their official shirt sponsor. In the 2020–21 I-League, NEROCA finished bottom of the Relegation Stage and got formally relegated, but were reinstated by AIFF after viewing the situation of COVID-19 pandemic.

On 4 July 2021, NEROCA signed Khogen Singh as their head coach for the 2021–22 I-League season, and began the league journey with a 3–2 win against Sreenidi Deccan on 27 December 2021. They achieved seventh position in league table. They later participated in 2022 Durand Cup. In 2022–23 I-League, NEROCA they finished on tenth position, and later, failed to qualify for the 2023 Indian Super Cup. In October, the club roped in Malaysian manager Jacob Joseph as head coach for 2023–24 league season.Then sacked and replaced him with Gyan Moyon In April 2024, NEROCA along with TRAU, refused to travel to Mizoram to play Aizawl in their away matches and the games were cancelled by the AIFF; Both the teams from Manipur were relegated to I-League 2. The club took part in the 2024–25 I-League 2, in which they later fought in the relegation stage alongside city rival TRAU.At the end of the 2025-26 I-League 2,NEROCA finished with 5 points,-4 GD,tied with MYJ-GMSC,but were relegated to the 2026-27 I-League 3,on head to head as they lost to MYJ-GMSC 2-1 in Matchweek 3.

In September 2026,the club took part in the 1st Gift Raikhan Memorial Football Tournamentand got a bye to the quarter finals,in which they lost 0-3 to Asufi FA.In October 2026,they participated in the Manipur Police Football Cup,in which they reached the final and lost 4-2 on penalties to FC Raengdai after drawing 0-0 in regulation time.They participated in the 2026-27 I-League 3,and were in Group A,they eventually won Group Aand qualified for the playoff round.

== Crest, colours & kits ==
In the official club crest, there is map of Manipur in background and an anchor of sailing boat in foreground.

The official colours of NEROCA are orange and green.

=== Kit manufacturers and shirt sponsors ===
Period	Kit manufacturer	Shirt sponsor
2015—2016	Glory Sports	Classic Group of Hotels
2016—2017	Bee Athletic	Classic Group of Hotels
2017—2018	Vector X	Classic Group of Hotels
2018—2019	Sqad Gear	Classic Group of Hotels
2019–2020	Vicky Transform	Living 3D
2020–2021	Ambition Sportswear	GMT
2021–2022	Nivia Sports	Vintel Infracom Pvt. Ltd.
2022–2023	Ambition Sportswear	GOELD Frozen Foods
2023–2024	King	GOELD Frozen Foods
2024-Present	Vamos	M/s. Kim & Sons

== Stadium ==
Khuman Lampak Main Stadium in Imphal, Manipur, is used as the home ground of NEROCA Football Club for all their home matches in both the domestic and regional leagues. Opened in 1999, the stadium is owned by All Manipur Football Association and has a capacity of 35,285 spectators. Their first home match in the I-League was played on 15 December 2017 against Chennai City FC.

== Support and rivalry ==
=== Supporters ===
NEROCA had the 2nd highest average attendance for the 2018–19 I League season. In the 2017–18 season, NEROCA had the highest attendance in the I-League, with the record attendance of 35,285 at the Khuman Lampak Stadium.

=== Rivalries ===
NEROCA have participated in the Imphal Derby with city rival TRAU. The two clubs are the only two from Imphal to have played professional league football. The Imphal Derby gained fame in 2022 during the 131st edition of Durand Cup when competitive football returned to the city after COVID-19 pandemic in India. The Government of Manipur declared a half-holiday for all governmental and educational institutions in build-up to the match on 18 August, where NEROCA defeated TRAU by 3–1 in Group-C opener. However, in 2025 Durand Cup Group F, opening again, held at Khuman Lampak Stadium in Imphal, TRAU and NEROCA clashed ferrociously. Notably, TRAU played with only 10 men from 80 minutes onwards due to a red card. The opening match ended in a 1–1 draw.

They also have a rivalry with Southern Sporting Union,another Imphal based club,so can be called the Imphal Derby.

In the I-League 3,They have a rivalry with KLASA in the Manipur Derby,and also in the I-League 2 vs FC Raengdai,in the Manipur Derby.

In the Northeast Derby (I-League), they have a rivalry with Mizoram-based club Aizawl.

== Players ==
=== First-team squad ===
As of 20 April 2026

Note: Flags indicate national team as defined under FIFA eligibility rules; some limited exceptions apply. Players may hold more than one non-FIFA nationality.

No.	Pos.	Nation	Player
1	GK	IND	Jackson Singh
2	DF	IND	Pritam Kumar Singh
3	DF	IND	Sanathoi Meetei
5	MF	IND	Saphaba Singh Telem
7	MF	IND	Sibajit Singh
8	MF	IND	Suranjit Singh
9	FW	IND	Phijam Sanathoi Meitei
11	MF	IND	Horam
12	DF	IND	Waikhom Rohit Meitei |other=captain}
13	GK	IND	Prateek Singh
14	MF	IND	Lourembam David Singh
15	DF	IND	Yumnam Surchandra
16	DF	IND	Zlex Mangang
17	DF	IND	Korouhanba Laishram
19	MF	IND	Konthoujam Amarjit Singh

No.	Pos.	Nation	Player
22	FW	IND	Phijam Sanathoi Meitei
24	FW	IND	Alocious Muthayyan
25	MF	IND	Arunjacki
26	DF	IND	Arunkumar Singh
28	FW	IND	Sinam Maicheal
30	MF	IND	Rohit Singh
31	GK	IND	Indrasen Singh
40	MF	IND	Muktasana
44	DF	IND	Ronaldo Nongthombam
48	MF	IND	Karanshu Pandya Rajesh
66	DF	IND	Mongo.T
78	MF	IND	Malemnganba
88	MF	IND	Manasseh Poupekah
93	DF	IND	Lanchienkido singh
99	GK	IND	Arup Kapuria

== Personnel ==
=== Current technical staff ===
As of 2 October 2026

Role	Name	Refs.
Head coach	(India) Yumnam Raju	
Assistant coach	(India) Premkanta Singh	
Secretary	(India) Leimapokpam Rojit Meitei	
Goalkeeping coach	(India) Premkanta Singh	
Team manager	(India) Laishram Rajiv Singh	
Physio	(India) Kshterimayum Karan Singh	
Kit manager	(India) Lairellakpam Shobha Singh	

== Team records ==
Season	Div.	Tms.	Pos.	Average attendance	Federation Cup/Super Cup	Durand Cup	AFC CL	AFC Cup
2015–16	I-League 2	10	3	–	DNP	DNP	–	–
2016–17	I-League 2	12	1	8,438	DNP	Runners-up	–	–
2017–18	I-League	10	2	21,382	Quarter-finals	DNP	DNP	DNP
2018–19	I-League	11	6	19,139	Round of 16	DNP	DNP	DNP
2019–20	I-League	11	9	13,202	–	DNP	DNP	DNP
2020–21	I-League	11	11	–	–	DNP	DNP	DNP
2021-22	I-League	13	7	–	–	DNP	DNP	DNP
2022-23	I-League	12	10	3,400	Second Qualifying Round	Group Stage	DNP	DNP
2023-24	I-League	13	12	362	DNP	DNP	DNP	DNP
2024–25	I-League 2	9	7	482	DNP	Group Stage	DNP	DNP
2025–26	I-League 2	9	9	1,164	DNP	Group Stage	DNP	DNP

Key

- Tms. = Number of teams
- Pos. = Position in league
- Attendance/G = Average league attendance

=== Overall records ===
updated on 28 May 2017

Season	Domestic							Asia					
Season	Division	P	W	D	L	GF	GA	P	W	D	L	GF	GA
2015–16	3	18	8	5	5	20	16	Not qualified					
2016–17	3	16	12	3	1	28	7	Not qualified					
2017–18	2	18	9	5	4	20	13	Not qualified					
2018–19	2	20	7	6	7	27	26	Not qualified					
2019–20	2	16	5	3	8	27	35	Not qualified					
2020-21	2	14	2	2	10	14	22	Not qualified					
2021-22	2	18	4	8	6	21	30	Not qualified					
2022-23	2	22	7	4	11	22	26	Not qualified					
2023-24	2	23	4	2	17	26	61	Not qualified					
2024–25	3	16	5	2	9	17	27	Not qualified					
2025-26	3	8	1	2	5	11	15	Not qualified					

=== Top scorers ===
As of 3 October 2026

Season	Player	Goals
2015–16	(Nigeria) Ejiogu Emmanuel	3
2016–17	(Nigeria) Felix Chidi Odili	9
2017–18	(Nigeria) Felix Chidi Odili	7
2018–19	(Nigeria) Felix Chidi Odili	8
2019–20	(Ghana) Philip Adjah	9
2020–21	(Trinidad and Tobago) Judah García	4
2021–22	(Spain) Sergio Mendigutxia	10
2022–23	(Jamaica) Jourdaine Fletcher	9
2023–24	(Liberia) Ansumana Kromah	6
2024–25	(India) Chabungam Linky Meitei	7
2025-26	(India) Phijam Sanathoi Meitei	6

=== Other records ===
- Fastest goal for the club in I-League: (Japan) Katsumi Yusa — 13 seconds; NEROCA vs Churchill Brothers (2018–19)

== Notable players ==
=== Past and present internationals ===
- The players below had senior/youth international cap(s) for their respective countries. Players whose name is listed, represented their countries before or after playing for NEROCA FC.

=== India ===
- (India) Tomba Singh (2016)
- (India) Sushil Kumar Singh (2016–2018)
- (India) Govin Singh (2016–2018)
- (India) Arata Izumi (2017)
- (India) Gouramangi Singh (2017–2018)

=== Asia ===
- (Kyrgyzstan) Akhlidin Israilov (2017)
- (Australia) Nick Ward (2018–2019)
- (Bhutan) Chencho Gyeltshen (2019)
- (Nepal) Prakash Budhathoki (2020–2021)
- (Lebanon) Mohamad Kdouh (2020–2022)
- (Kyrgyzstan) Bektur Talgat Uulu (2022–)
- (Uzbekistan) Mirjalol Kosimov (2022–2023)

=== North America ===
- (Haiti) Fabien Vorbe (2017–2018)
- (Trinidad and Tobago) Judah García (2020–2021)
- (Trinidad and Tobago) Marvin Phillip (2019–2020)
- (Trinidad and Tobago) Nathaniel García (2020–2021)
- (Trinidad and Tobago) Richard Roy (2017–2018)
- (Trinidad and Tobago) Taryk Sampson (2019–2020)
- (Jamaica) Jourdaine Fletcher (2022–2023)
- (Jamaica) Fabian Reid (2023–2024)

=== Africa ===
- (Liberia) Varney Kallon (2016–2019, 2020)
- (Equatorial Guinea) Eduardo Ferreira (2018–2019)
- (Mali) Boubacar Diarra (2019–2020)
- (Togo) Sekle Yawo Zico (2019–2020)
- (Togo) Gaty Kouami (2019–2020)
- (Sierra Leone) David Simbo (2022–)
- (Ghana) Michael Kporvi (2023–)

=== Europe ===
- (Hungary) Attila Busai (2020)
- (Spain) Sergio Mendigutxia (2021–2022)
- (Romania) Marius Leca (2023–2024)

== Managerial record ==
Information correct after match played on 7 March 2022. Only competitive matches are counted.

Name	Nationality	From	To	P	W	D	L	GF	GA	Win%	Ref.
Gift Raikhan	India	1 July 2015	30 April 2018	44	26	10	8	61	31	59.09	
Manuel Retamero	Spain	7 June 2018	11 March 2019	20	7	5	8	27	26	35.00	
Renedy Singh	India	12 March 2019	8 May 2019	0	0	0	0	0	0	—	
Gift Raikhan	India	4 September 2019	31 May 2021	31	7	6	18	41	57	22.58	
Khogen Singh	India	5 July 2021	6 October 2023	44	12	12	20	42	63	27.27%	
Jacob Joseph	Malaysia	7 October 2023	14 January 2024	11	2	1	8	15	33	18.18%	
Gyan Moyon	India	14 January 2024	27 February 2026	31	7	5	19	30	59	22.58%	
Gift Raikhan	India	27 February 2026	22 June 2026	8	1	2	5	11	15	12.50%.	

== Honours ==
=== League ===
- I-League
  - Runners-up (1): 2017–18
- I-League 2nd Division
  - Champions (1): 2016–17
  - Third place (1): 2015–16
- Manipur State League
  - Champions (2): 2014, 2016
  - Runners-up (2): 2007, 2009

=== Cup ===
- Durand Cup
  - Runners-up (1): 2016
- Tiddim Invitation Football Trophy
  - Champions (1): 2004
  - Runners-up (2): 2005, 2007
- Churachand Singh Trophy
  - Champions (6): 2000, 2012–13, 2014–15, 2016, 2018–19, 2019
  - Runners-up (2): 2002, 2008
- Bodousa Cup
  - Runners-up (2): 2010, 2015
- Shirui Lily Cup
  - Runners-up (1): 2011

=== Award ===
- I-League Fair Play Award: 2017–18

== Other department ==
=== Futsal ===
NEROCA operates futsal departments and is affiliated to the Futsal Association of India (FAI). The club clinched AMFA (All Manipur Football Association) Futsal Cup in 2005, defeating SSU in final. The club is currently competing in Col. Arunkumar Memorial Inter-club Futsal Tournament, achieved third place in the 2023 edition.

Honours

- AMFA Futsal Cup
  - Champions (1): 2005
- Col. Arunkumar Memorial Championship
  - Third place (1): 2023

== See also ==
- List of football clubs in Manipur
- Sports in Manipur
