= Araang League =

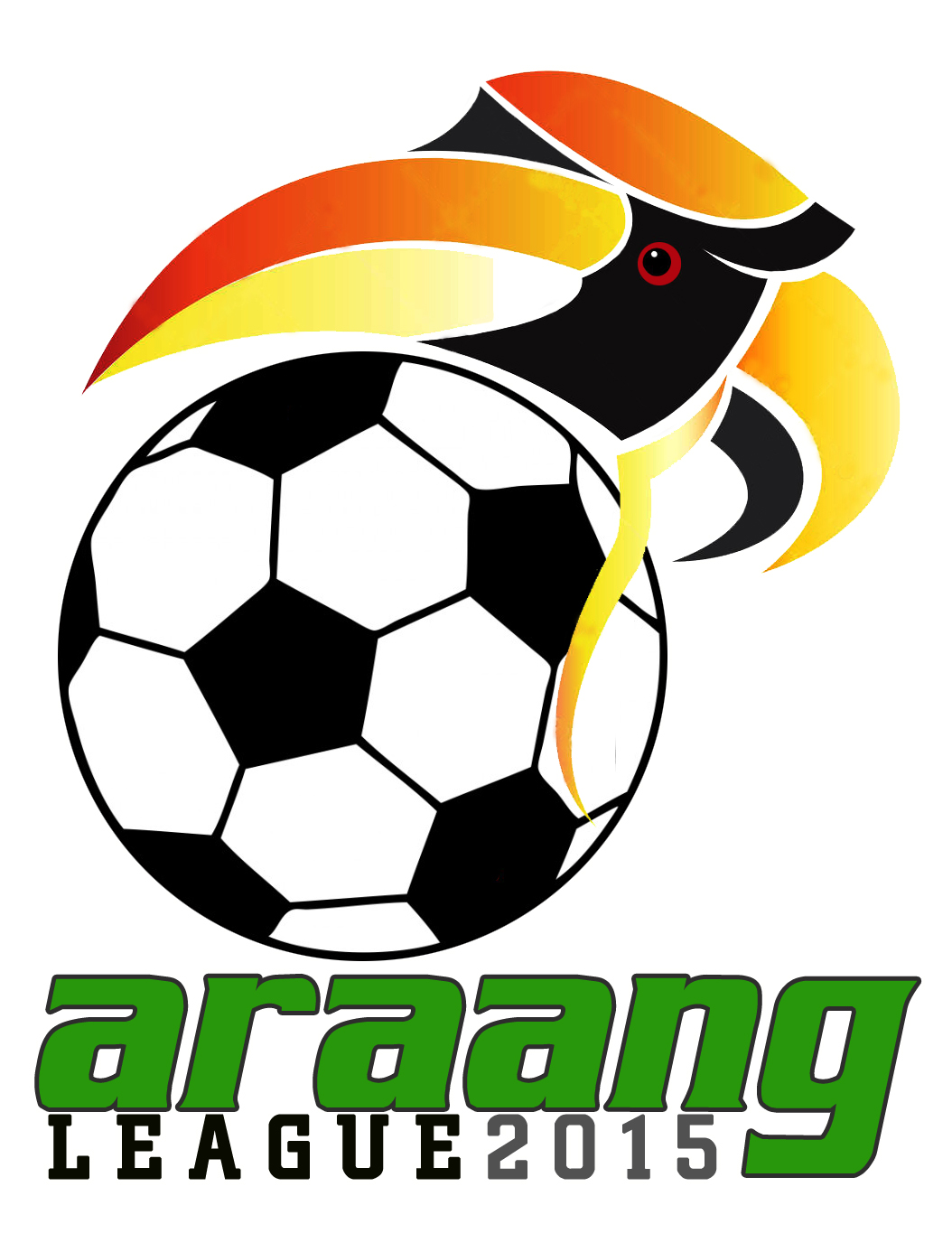
Official Logo

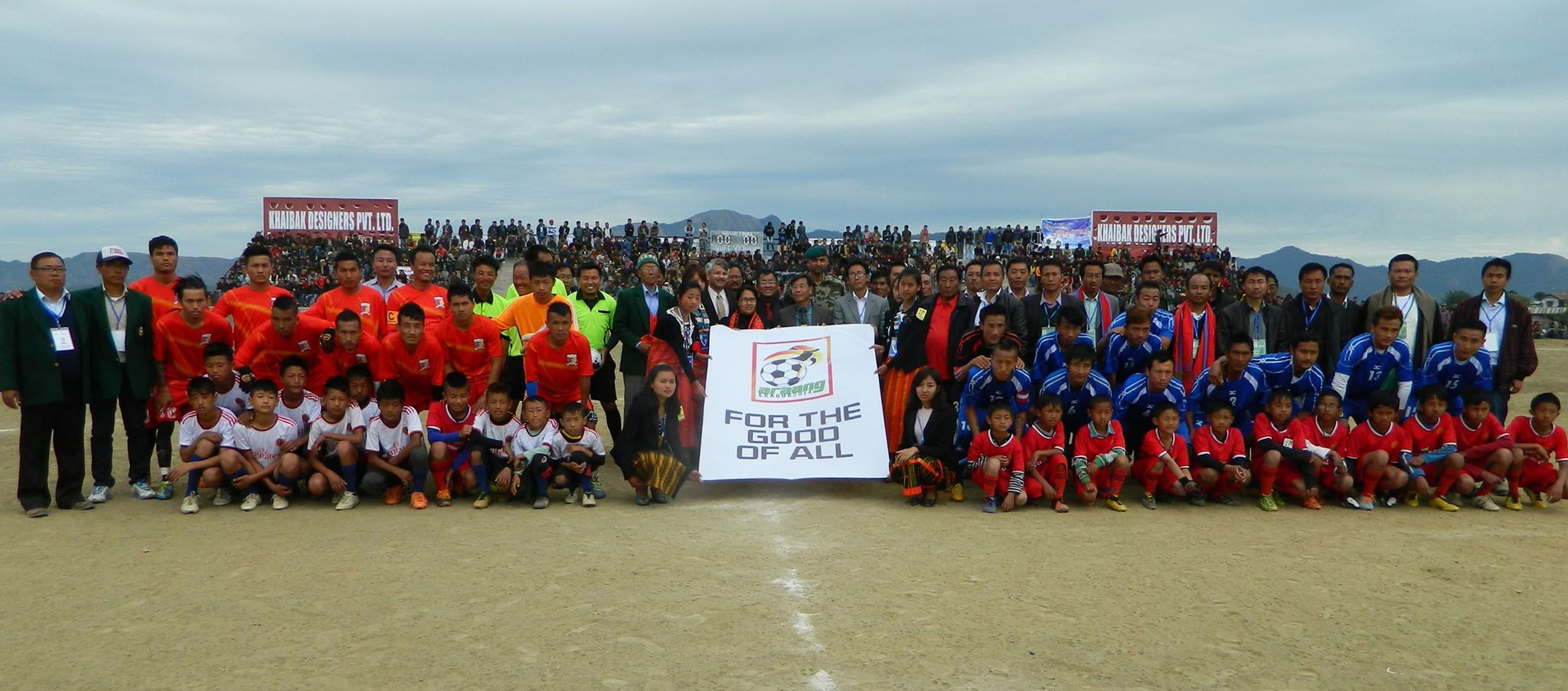
1 edition December 2014

Araang League is an annual football league in Manipur state of India that promotes young footballers in Manipur and NorthEast India. The League is registered with All Manipur Football Association (AMFA) - AMFA is the state governing body of football in Manipur. It is affiliated with the All India Football Federation, the national governing body.

The first edition of Araang League football championship was hosted by the organizers with the partnership of Assam Rifles (Ukhrul District) and several private sponsors, notably Khaibak Designers Pvt Ltd in December 2014. Five times World Women's Boxing Champion Mary Kom inaugurated the tournament. The second edition of Araang League was held on 5 December 2015 at Tangkhul Naga Long Ground and Bakshi Mini Stadium, Ukhrul town.

Araang League is also the name of the governing body, the organization. The operations centre of the Football League is in Ukhrul, while its commercial office is New Delhi.

== Araang mascot ==
Araang League announced a mascot drawing open competition in September 2017. Football enthusiasts and well-wishers participated in the event and finally a mascot was chosen to be the winner. The Chief Minister of Manipur, Nongthombam Biren Singh launched the official mascot of the Araang League on 18 September 2017.

The Sangai Express, the largest circulating newspaper in Manipur is its media partner.
