= Manipur Premier League =

Association football league in Manipur, India

- Organising body: All Manipur Football Association
- Founded: 2023; 3 years ago
- Country: India
- Number of clubs: 15
- Level on pyramid: 5
- Promotion to: I-League 3
- Relegation to: AMFA Cup
- Domestic cup: Churachand Singh Trophy
- Current champions: Southern Sporting Union (2nd title) (2025–26)
- Most championships: Southern Sporting Union (2 titles)
- Broadcaster(s): ED Sports Live (YouTube)
- Current: 2025–26

The Manipur Premier League is the highest state-level men's football league in Manipur, India. The first season was started in 2023, organised by the All Manipur Football Association. While the highest state league until the 2022–23 season, Manipur State League is still held, the champions of Manipur Premier League was given the spot for promotion to I-League 3.

== History ==
The Manipur Premier League was introduced as an elite football competition in the state and become the apex of football in Manipur and provide the foundations for grassroots and youth development. The first season was won by both Southern Sporting Union (SSU) and Asufii Football Academy, who were declared the joint winners of the first season as the final match was abandoned due to crowd trouble. The second season was won by FC Raengdai representing Noney district.

== League structure ==
| Tier | Division |
|---|---|
| 1 _{(5 on Indian football Pyramid)} | Manipur Premier League |
| 2 _{(6 on Indian football pyramid)} | AMFA Cup |
| 3 _{(7 on Indian football pyramid)} | AMFA Winners' Cup (Thangjam Birchandra-Maipakpi Memorial Winners' Cup) |
| 4 _{(8 on Indian football pyramid)} | District leagues |

== Stadiums ==
The stadiums that are used for the Manipur Premier League are Artificial Turf Ground, Lamlong Thongkhong, SAI Ground in Takyel located in Imphal.

== Prize money ==
Prize money for the 3rd Manipur Premier League:

| | Purse |
|---|---|
| Champions | ₹5 lakh |
| Runners-up | ₹3 lakh |

== Teams ==
=== 2025–26 season ===
| Team | Location |
|---|---|
| Athletic Brother's Association | Porompat, Imphal East |
| All Moirang Football Association (AMOFA) | Moirang, Bishnupur |
| Angtha FC | Angtha Yaripok, Imphal East |
| Anouba Imagi Mangal (AIM) | Khabam Lamkhai, Imphal East |
| Asufii Football Academy | Punanamei, Senapati |
| Imphal Youth FC (IYFC) | Imphal |
| Kshetri Iril Mapal Youth Club (KIYC) | Kshetri Iril Mapal, Imphal East |
| Mayang Imphal United FC | Mayang Imphal, Imphal West |
| Rising Athletic Union (RAU) | Imphal |
| Sagolband United | Sagolband, Imphal West |
| Sang-Gai Heroes | Angtha, Imphal East |
| Social Sporting Club | Sekta, Imphal East |
| Southern Sporting Union (SSU) | Imphal |
| United Chandel FC | Chandel |
| Young Physique's Union (YPHU) | Imphal |

== Champions ==
| Season | Champions | Runners-up | Ref |
|---|---|---|---|
| 2023–24 | Southern Sporting Union and Asufii FA (joint winners) | | |
| 2024–25 | FC Raengdai | Asufii FA | |
| 2025–26 | Southern Sporting Union | Anouba Imagi Mangal | |
