= 2022–23 NEROCA FC season =

2022–23 football season for NEROCA Football Club

NEROCA
2022–23 season
- Head coach: Khogen Singh
- I-League: 10th out of 12
- AIFF Super Cup: Qualifiers
- Durand Cup: Group stage

The 2022–23 season was the 57th season of NEROCA FC in existence and sixth season in the I-League

== Players ==
As of 13 August 2022

Note: Flags indicate national team as defined under FIFA eligibility rules; some limited exceptions apply. Players may hold more than one non-FIFA nationality.

No.	Pos.	Nation	Player
1	GK	(India) IND	Soram Poirei
2	DF	(India) IND	Thokchom Singh
3	DF	(India) IND	Lallenmang Sitlhou
4	DF	(India) IND	Waikhom Rohit Meitei
5	DF	(India) IND	Seilenlal Mate
6	DF	(India) IND	Aimol Reamsochung (vice-captain)
7	MF	(Kyrgyzstan) KGZ	Bektur Talgat
8	MF	(India) IND	Naorem Tondomba Singh (on loan from Mumbai City) (captain)
9	FW	(Nigeria) NGA	John Chidi
10	MF	(Uzbekistan) UZB	Sardor Jakhonov
11	MF	(India) IND	Thomyo Shimray
12	MF	(India) IND	Lourembam David Singh
13	GK	(India) IND	Shubham Dhas
14	MF	(India) IND	Chunsaba Bariam

No.	Pos.	Nation	Player
15	MF	(India) IND	Nonganba Akoijam
16	MF	(India) IND	Benjamin Lupheng
18	DF	(Sierra Leone) SLE	David Simbo
19	MF	(India) IND	Vicky Meitei
20	DF	(India) IND	Thokchom Johnson Singh
21	GK	(India) IND	Md Abujar
22	FW	(India) IND	Lunminlen Haokip
24	DF	(India) IND	Abhisekh Saikia
25	MF	(India) IND	Jonychand Singh
26	DF	(India) IND	Likmabam Rakesh Singh
28	FW	(Brazil) BRA	Thiago Santos
30	DF	(India) IND	Paogoumang Singson (on loan from Hyderabad)
40	MF	(India) IND	Tangva Ragui
—	FW	(Jamaica) JAM	Jourdain Fletcher

== Pre-season and friendlies ==
1 October 2022 Friendly	NorthEast United	2-0	NEROCA	Guwahati
15:15 IST	Jithin 13'; Nigam 89'	Report		Stadium: Indira Gandhi Athletic Stadium

== Competitions ==
=== I-League ===
==== League table ====
Pos	Team	Pld	W	D	L	GF	GA	GD	Pts	Qualification
8	Mohammedan	22	7	5	10	34	35	−1	26 (Note: Head-to-head points: Aizawl 4, Mohammedan 1.)	
9	Rajasthan United	22	7	4	11	19	32	−13	25 (Note: Head-to-head points: Rajasthan United 6, NEROCA 0.)	
10	NEROCA	22	7	4	11	22	26	−4	25	
11	Kenkre (R)	22	3	8	11	23	40	−17	17	Relegation to 2023–24 I-League 2
12	Sudeva Delhi (R)	22	3	4	15	25	56	−31	13	Relegation to 2023–24 I-League 2

Source: I-League
Rules for classification: 1) points; 2) head-to-head points; 3) head-to-head goal difference; 4) goal difference; 5) number of goals scored; 6) drawing of lots
(R) Relegated

=== Super Cup ===
After finishing 10th in the I-League, NEROCA had to play a qualifying playoff against 9th-ranked Rajasthan to earn a place in the qualifiers, beating tem on penalties. In qualifiers they lost to Sreenidi Deccan, ending their Super Cup campaign.

==== Matches ====
Win Draw Loss

==== Qualifying Playoff ====
3 April 2023 Qualifying play-off	Rajasthan United	2–2 (a.e.t.)	NEROCA	Manjeri
20:30 IST	Kharpan 65'; Lalremsanga 98'	Report	L. Haokip 45+1'; L. Sitlhou (red card) 102'; S. Fernandes 120+3'	Stadium: Payyanad Stadium; Attendance: 1,210; Referee: Pratik Mondal; Man of the Match: Soram Poirei (NEROCA)
	Penalties
	R. Gupta (penalty missed); Neihsial (penalty scored); Amritpal (penalty missed); Horam (penalty missed)		S. Fernandes (penalty scored); P. Singson (penalty scored); L. Rakesh Meitei (penalty missed); J. Singh (penalty scored)

==== Qualifiers ====
5 April 2023 Q-1	Sreenidi Deccan	4–2	NEROCA	Manjeri
17:00 IST	Shayesteh 37'; Castañeda 55'; Olanrewaju 90+1' (90+3)	Report	Ragui 67'; Benjamin 80'	Stadium: Payyanad Stadium; Man of the Match: Rilwan Olanrewaju Hassan
