= 2016 Manipur State League =

Manipur State League
- Season: 2016
- Champions: NEROCA (2nd title)
- Matches: 80

The 2016 Manipur State League was the 11th season of the Manipur State League, the top-division football league in the Indian state of Manipur. The league began on 24 August 2016 and ended on 25 November with the final. NEROCA emerged as champions.

== Teams ==
- Anouba Imagee Mangal
- Keinou Library & Sports Association
- Nambul Mapal Athletics & Cultural Organisation
- North Imphal Sporting Association
- NEROCA
- Sagolband United
- Southern Sporting Union
- Tiddim Road Athletics Union
- Tiddim Road Unique Gamy Players Union
- Young Physique Union
- United Sporting Association
- F.C. Zalen

== League table ==
Pos	Team	Pld	W	D	L	GF	GA	GD	Pts	Qualification or relegation
1	NEROCA	11	9	2	0	22	4	+18	29	Playoffs
2	Tiddim Road Athletics Union	11	7	2	2	17	7	+10	23	Playoffs
3	Anouba Imagee Mangal	11	7	1	3	20	10	+10	22	Playoffs
4	F.C. Zalen	11	7	1	3	21	12	+9	22	Playoffs
5	North Imphal Sporting Association	11	6	3	2	17	14	+3	21	Playoffs
6	Nambul Mapal Athletics & Cultural Organisation	11	4	1	6	13	18	−5	13	Playoffs
7	Keinou Library & Sports Association	11	3	3	5	10	12	−2	12	Playoffs
8	Young Physique Union	11	3	2	6	13	18	−5	11	Playoffs
9	Southern Sporting Union	11	3	1	7	12	16	−4	10	
10	Sagolband United	11	3	1	7	10	17	−7	10	
11	United Sporting Association	11	2	1	8	12	28	−16	7	Relegation
12	Tiddim Road Unique Gamy Players Union	11	1	2	8	10	22	−12	5	Relegation

Updated to match(es) played on 26 November 2016. Source:
Rules for classification: 1) Points; 2) Goal difference; 3) Goals scored

== Final ==
25 November 2016	NEROCA	0–0 (4–3 p)	Anouba Imagee Mangal	Imphal
		Report		Stadium: Khuman Lampak Main Stadium

== End-of-season awards ==
Award	Player/Club
Golden Boot (13 goals)	(India) Th Modhumangol (India) N Pritam
Best player	(India) Lalit Thapa
