= Khangabok Assembly constituency =

Legislative Assembly constituency in Manipur State, India

Coordinates: 24.61°N 93.99°E

Khangabok
- Constituency for the Manipur Legislative Assembly

Constituency details
- Country: India
- Region: Northeast India
- State: Manipur
- District: Thoubal
- Lok Sabha constituency: Outer Manipur
- Established: 1967
- Total electors: 37,687
- Reservation: None

Member of Legislative Assembly
- 12th Manipur Legislative Assembly
- Incumbent Surjakumar Okram
- Party: INC
- Alliance: MPSA
- Elected year: 2022

Khangabok Legislative Assembly constituency is one of the 60 Legislative Assembly constituencies of Manipur state in India.

It is part of Thoubal district.

== Members of the Legislative Assembly ==
Year	Winner	Party
1967	M. Chaoba	Indian National Congress
1972	Thokchom Achouba	Communist Party of India
1974	Thokchom Achouba	Communist Party of India
1980	Thokchom Achouba	Communist Party of India
1984	Okram Ibobi Singh	Independent politician
1990	Okram Ibobi Singh	Indian National Congress
1995	Laishram Jatra Singh	Manipur Peoples Party
2000	Laishram Jatra Singh	Manipur Peoples Party
2002	Okram Ibobi Singh	Indian National Congress
2007	Okram Ibobi Singh	Indian National Congress
2007★	Okram Landhoni Devi	Indian National Congress
2012	Okram Landhoni Devi	Indian National Congress
2017	Surjakumar Okram	Indian National Congress
2022	Surjakumar Okram	Indian National Congress

★By election

== Election results ==
Vote share of winning candidates
2022	49.76%
2017	64.22%
2012	68.01%
2007	62.98%
2002	53.54%
2000	48.73%
1995	39.99%
1990	35.21%
1984	25.91%
1980	24.93%
1974	33.43%
1972	48.07%
1967	35.29%

=== 2027 Assembly election ===
2027 Manipur Legislative Assembly election: Khangabok
Party	Candidate	Votes	%	±%
INC				
NDA				
NOTA	None of the above			
Majority				
Turnout				
gain from		Swing		

=== 2022 Assembly election ===
2022 Manipur Legislative Assembly election: Khangabok
Party	Candidate	Votes	%	±%
INC	Surjakumar Okram	17,435	49.76%	−14.46%
BJP	Khundrakpammenjor Mangang	9,632	27.49%	−7.52%
JD(U)	Thokchom Jadumani Singh	7,555	21.56%	
NOTA	Nota	413	1.18%	
Margin of victory		7,803	22.27%	−6.94%
Turnout		35,035	92.96%	0.21%
Registered electors		37,687		8.03%
INC hold		Swing	-14.46%	

=== 2017 Assembly election ===
2017 Manipur Legislative Assembly election: Khangabok
Party	Candidate	Votes	%	±%
INC	Surjakumar Okram	20,781	64.22%	−3.79%
BJP	Thokchom Jadumani Singh	11,329	35.01%	
Margin of victory		9,452	29.21%	−7.40%
Turnout		32,359	92.75%	4.75%
Registered electors		34,887		13.86%
INC hold		Swing	-3.79%	

=== 2012 Assembly election ===
2012 Manipur Legislative Assembly election: Khangabok
Party	Candidate	Votes	%	±%
INC	Okram Landhoni Devi	18,339	68.01%	5.03%
MPP	Laishram Jatra Singh	8,468	31.40%	−4.94%
LJP	Haji Ashrab	152	0.56%	
Margin of victory		9,871	36.61%	9.97%
Turnout		26,964	87.98%	−3.38%
Registered electors		30,641		5.08%
INC hold		Swing	5.03%	

=== 2007 Assembly election ===
2007 Manipur Legislative Assembly election: Khangabok
Party	Candidate	Votes	%	±%
INC	Okram Ibobi Singh	16,782	62.98%	9.44%
MPP	Laishram Jatra Singh	9,684	36.34%	
SP	Haji Asrab	180	0.68%	
Margin of victory		7,098	26.64%	16.96%
Turnout		26,646	91.38%	−5.70%
Registered electors		29,159		16.79%
INC hold		Swing	9.44%	

=== 2002 Assembly election ===
2002 Manipur Legislative Assembly election: Khangabok
Party	Candidate	Votes	%	±%
INC	Okram Ibobi Singh	12,897	53.54%	5.04%
FPM	Laishram Jatra	10,567	43.87%	41.58%
CPI	Thokchom Achouba	389	1.61%	
MSCP	Abdul Rashid	172	0.71%	
Margin of victory		2,330	9.67%	9.45%
Turnout		24,087	97.08%	0.48%
Registered electors		24,966		4.42%
INC gain from MPP		Swing	13.55%	

=== 2000 Assembly election ===
2000 Manipur Legislative Assembly election: Khangabok
Party	Candidate	Votes	%	±%
MPP	Laishram Jatra Singh	11,144	48.73%	8.74%
INC	Okram Ibobi Singh	11,092	48.50%	14.18%
FPM	Moirangthem Borajao Singh	523	2.29%	
Margin of victory		52	0.23%	−5.44%
Turnout		22,870	96.32%	−0.27%
Registered electors		23,909		13.93%
MPP hold		Swing	8.74%	

=== 1995 Assembly election ===
1995 Manipur Legislative Assembly election: Khangabok
Party	Candidate	Votes	%	±%
MPP	Laishram Jatra Singh	8,021	39.99%	15.95%
INC	Okram Ibobi Singh	6,884	34.32%	−0.89%
CPI	Md. Abdurahaman	5,153	25.69%	7.90%
Margin of victory		1,137	5.67%	−5.50%
Turnout		20,058	96.60%	1.41%
Registered electors		20,986		−5.43%
MPP gain from INC		Swing	4.77%	

=== 1990 Assembly election ===
1990 Manipur Legislative Assembly election: Khangabok
Party	Candidate	Votes	%	±%
INC	Okram Ibobi	7,320	35.21%	17.10%
MPP	Moirangthem Borajao	4,998	24.04%	
Independent	Maibam Tomba	4,748	22.84%	
CPI	Achouba	3,699	17.79%	−1.03%
Margin of victory		2,322	11.17%	5.85%
Turnout		20,787	95.19%	2.54%
Registered electors		22,192		25.23%
INC gain from Independent		Swing	9.30%	

=== 1984 Assembly election ===
1984 Manipur Legislative Assembly election: Khangabok
Party	Candidate	Votes	%	±%
Independent	Okram Ibobi Singh	4,157	25.91%	
Independent	M. Borojao	3,303	20.59%	
CPI	Thokchom Achouba	3,020	18.83%	−6.11%
INC	Maibam Tomba	2,906	18.11%	
Independent	Md. Abdur Rahaman	2,562	15.97%	
Margin of victory		854	5.32%	2.73%
Turnout		16,042	92.65%	9.63%
Registered electors		17,721		14.12%
Independent gain from CPI		Swing	0.98%	

=== 1980 Assembly election ===
1980 Manipur Legislative Assembly election: Khangabok
Party	Candidate	Votes	%	±%
CPI	Thokehom Achouba	3,139	24.93%	−8.50%
Independent	Md. Abdul Jabar	2,812	22.34%	
INC(I)	Haibam Tomba	2,691	21.37%	
JP	M. Borajao	2,091	16.61%	
Independent	Akoijam Dinachandra	1,645	13.07%	
INC(U)	Laishram Mani	128	1.02%	
MPP	Md. Iboton	84	0.67%	−26.34%
Margin of victory		327	2.60%	−3.83%
Turnout		12,590	83.01%	−5.08%
Registered electors		15,529		28.11%
CPI hold		Swing	-8.50%	

=== 1974 Assembly election ===
1974 Manipur Legislative Assembly election: Khangabok
Party	Candidate	Votes	%	±%
CPI	Thokchom Achouba	3,491	33.43%	−14.64%
MPP	Moiranghem Borajao Singh	2,820	27.00%	
Independent	Ajoijam Dinachandra	2,316	22.18%	
Independent	Md. Abdul Jabbar	1,754	16.80%	
Independent	Kutub	62	0.59%	
Margin of victory		671	6.43%	−9.01%
Turnout		10,443	88.09%	6.06%
Registered electors		12,122		29.30%
CPI hold		Swing	-14.64%	

=== 1972 Assembly election ===
1972 Manipur Legislative Assembly election: Khangabok
Party	Candidate	Votes	%	±%
CPI	Thokchom Achouba	3,623	48.07%	21.82%
Independent	M D Kutub Ali	2,460	32.64%	
INC	Laisram Mani	1,454	19.29%	−16.00%
Margin of victory		1,163	15.43%	12.85%
Turnout		7,537	82.03%	4.89%
Registered electors		9,375		−44.35%
CPI gain from INC		Swing	12.78%	

=== 1967 Assembly election ===
1967 Manipur Legislative Assembly election: Khangabok
Party	Candidate	Votes	%	±%
INC	M. Chaoba	4,380	35.29%	
Independent	T. Achouba	4,060	32.71%	
CPI	T. Bira	3,258	26.25%	
Independent	N. Nityai	267	2.15%	
CPI(M)	K. I. Singh	216	1.74%	
Independent	T. Chakrabati	134	1.08%	
Independent	L. N. Singh	96	0.77%	
Margin of victory		320	2.58%	
Turnout		12,411	77.13%	
Registered electors		16,845		
INC win (new seat)				

== See also ==
- List of constituencies of the Manipur Legislative Assembly
- Thoubal district
