= Michael Kporvi =

Ghanaian footballer

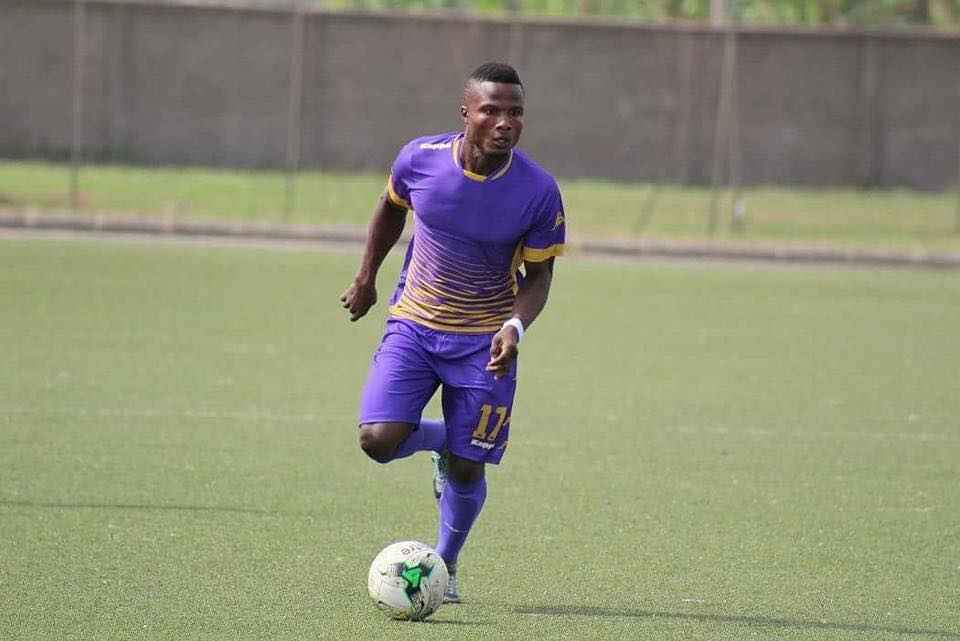
- Michael Kporvi playing for Tema Youth SC

Personal information
- Date of birth: 24 February 1995 (age 31)
- Place of birth: Accra, Ghana
- Height: 1.75 m (5 ft 9 in)
- Position: Striker

Team information
- Current team: NEROCA
- Number: 14

Youth career
- 2012–2015: AC Sondisco

Senior career*
Years	Team	Apps	(Gls)
2016–2017	Tema Youth SC	29	(14)
2017–2018	Africa Sports		
2019–2020	Al-Merrikh		
2020–2022	Inter Allies	6	(0)
2022–2023	BSS Sporting Club		
2023–	NEROCA	11	(4)

International career
	Ghana U17	0	(0)
- * Club domestic league appearances and goals as of 19:32, 5 March 2023 (UTC)

Michael Kporvi (born 24 February 1995) is a Ghanaian footballer who plays as a forward for NEROCA in the I-League.

== Club career ==
Kporvi started playing for the local club AC Sondisco, and made his senior debut for the club in 2012, aged only 16. On 14 April 2016, he signed a three-year deal with the Tema-based local club Tema Youth F.C.

He signed a one-year deal with Senegalese giants ASC Diaraf in October 2018. He represented Diaraf in the CAF Champions League.

On 21 July 2019, Kporvi signed a one-year contract with Sudanese giants Al-Merrikh SC.

=== NEROCA ===
On 6 January 2023, I-League club NEROCA announced the signing of Kporvi till the end of the season.
