= Thangjam Arunkumar =

Indian politician

Thangjam Arunkumar (born 1967) is an Indian politician from Manipur. He is an MLA from Wangkhei Assembly constituency in Imphal East District. He won the 2022 Manipur Legislative Assembly election, representing the Janata Dal (United). In September 2022, he along with four other JD (U) MLAs, joined the BJP.

== Early life and education ==
Arunkumar is from Lamlong, Lamphel, Imphal East District, Manipur. He is the son of late Thangjam Birchandra. He married Irengbam Purnimashi Devi and they have two children, Sanarik Thangjam and Abothoi Thangjam. He completed his L. L. B. In 1992 at ILS Law College, Pune after his graduation in arts at Christ College, Bangalore in 1989. Earlier, he did his Class 12 in 1985 at D. M. College of Arts, Manipur. He went to school at Tiny Tots Unique School in Imphal and passed his Class 10 in 1983. He runs his own business.

== Career ==
Arunkumar won from Wangkhei Assembly constituency representing the Janata Dal (United) in the 2022 Manipur Legislative Assembly election. In 2022, he polled 11,593 votes and defeated his nearest rival, Okram Henry of the BJP, by a margin of 753 votes. He joined the BJP in September the same year.
