= Taryk Sampson =

Trinidadian footballer

Personal information
- Date of birth: 5 March 1997 (age 29)
- Place of birth: Trinidad and Tobago
- Position: Centre-back

Team information
- Current team: NEROCA
- Number: 5

Senior career*
Years	Team	Apps	(Gls)
2013–2014	North East Stars	0	(0)
2016–2017	Ma Pau		
2017–2019	Central	2	(0)
2019–	NEROCA	15	(1)

International career
?	Trinidad and Tobago U20	0	(0)
- * Club domestic league appearances and goals as of 12:49, 05 April 2020 (UTC)

Taryk Sampson (born 5 March 1997) is a Trinidadian professional footballer who plays as a centre-back for I-League club NEROCA.

== Club career ==
Born in Trinidad and Tobago, Sampson initially signed with the Trinidadian club North East Stars in 2013. He had no appearance in the senior squad. He made his senior debut with TT Pro League side Ma Pau in the 2016–17 season, playing for them a couple of times. He was contracted with the club until July 2017. On 1 July 2017, he joined Central, another TT Pro League team, where he remained until 2019.

By mid-2019, Sampson signed a one-year contract with India's I-League side NEROCA. He made 15 appearances for the club, and scored his first I-League goal against Gokulam Kerala.

== Career statistics ==
Appearances and goals by club, season and competition
Club	Season	League			Super Cup		Total	
Club	Season	Division	Apps	Goals	Apps	Goals	Apps	Goals
Ma Pau	2017	TT Pro League	2	0	—	—	2	0
NEROCA	2019–20	I-League	15	1	—	—	15	1
