= Isaiah Garcia =

Trinidadian football player (born 1998)

Personal information
- Full name: Isaiah Irasto Garcia
- Date of birth: 22 August 1998 (age 28)
- Place of birth: San Fernando, Trinidad and Tobago
- Height: 1.60 m (5 ft 3 in)
- Position: Right-back

Team information
- Current team: Defence Force
- Number: 3

Youth career
- 2008–2016: W Connection

Senior career*
Years	Team	Apps	(Gls)
2016–2022	W Connection		(1)
2022–2023	Point Fortin Civic		
2023–	Defence Force		

International career^{‡}
2017	Trinidad and Tobago U20	3	(0)
2018	Trinidad and Tobago U21	2	(0)
2019–	Trinidad and Tobago	8	(0)
- * Club domestic league appearances and goals as of 14:45, 20 June 2025 (UTC) ‡ National team caps and goals as of 14:45, 20 June 2025 (UTC)

Isaiah Irasto Garcia (born 22 August 1998) is a Trinidadian football player who plays as right-back for TT Pro League club Defence Force, and the Trinidad and Tobago.

== Career ==
Garcia is a youth product of W Connection since he was a U10, and debuted with their team in 2016. He helped them win the 2018 TT Pro League. In 2020, he had a complicated trial in Egypt that resulted in him unable to return to Trinidad and drew police attention with accusations of him being trafficked. He had a stint with Point Fortin Civic in the first half of 2023. On 8 August 2023, Garcia signed transferred to Defence Force.

== International career ==
Garcia captained the Trinidad and Tobago U20s in 2017. He was called up to the Trinidad and Tobago national team for the 2025 Unity Cup. He was again called up to the national team for the 2025 CONCACAF Gold Cup.

== Personal life ==
Garcia's cousins, Nathaniel, Levi, and Judah are all professional footballers.

== Honours ==
W Connection

- TT Pro League: 2018
- Trinidad and Tobago Charity Shield: 2018
