= Levi García =

Trinidadian association football player

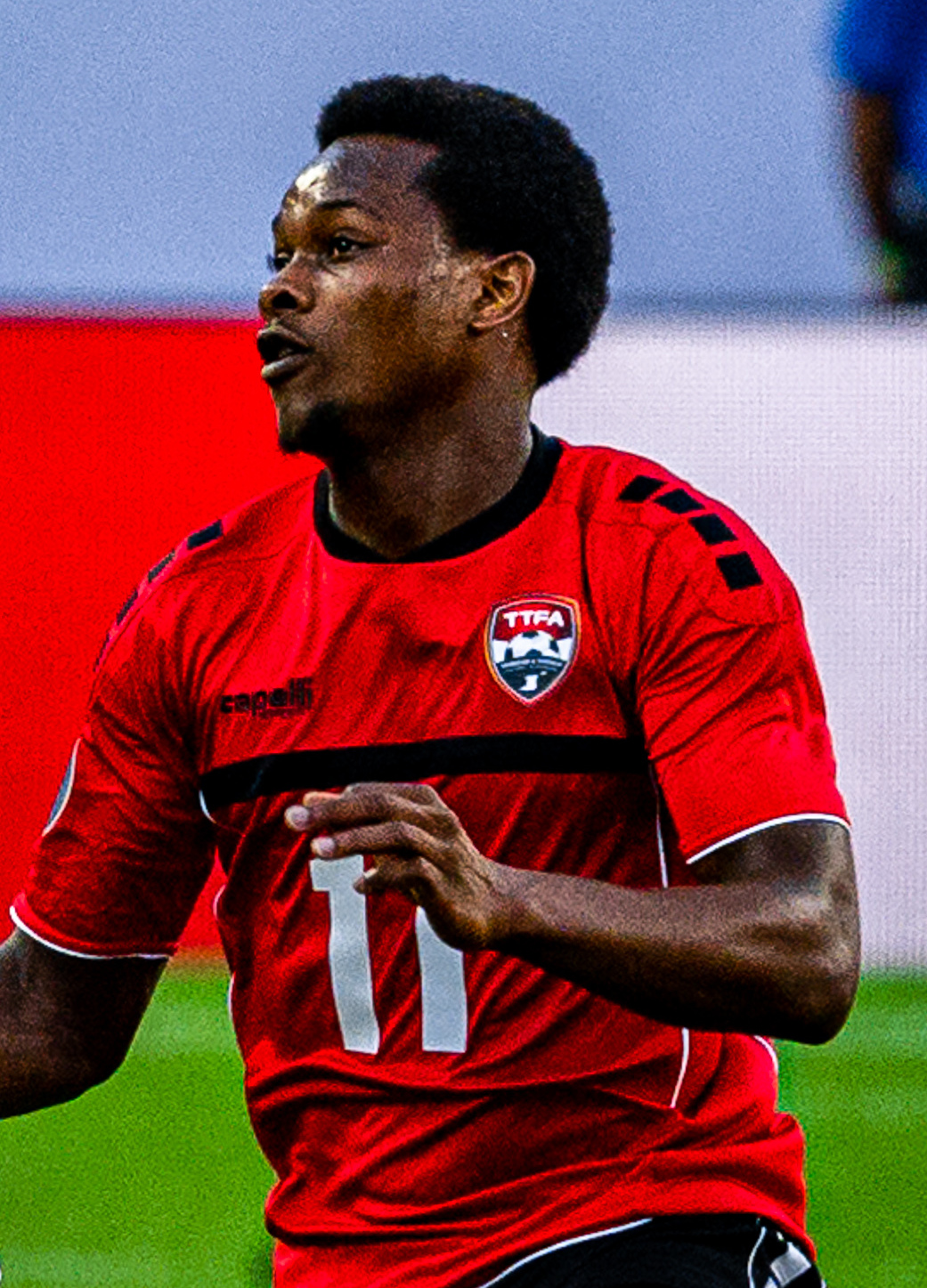
- García with Trinidad and Tobago in 2019

Personal information
- Full name: Levi Samuel García
- Date of birth: 20 November 1997 (age 29)
- Place of birth: Santa Flora, Trinidad, Trinidad and Tobago
- Height: 1.82 m (6 ft 0 in)
- Positions: Forward; winger

Team information
- Current team: Panathinaikos (on loan from Spartak Moscow)
- Number: 99

Youth career
- 2011–2014: Shiva Boys' Hindu College
- 2012–2013: T&TEC
- 2013–2014: Siparia Spurs

Senior career*
Years	Team	Apps	(Gls)
2012–2013	T&TEC		
2014–2015	Central FC		
2015–2018	AZ	29	(2)
2016–2018	→ Jong AZ	17	(7)
2018	→ Excelsior (loan)	15	(1)
2018–2019	Ironi Kiryat Shmona	20	(3)
2019–2020	Beitar Jerusalem	30	(5)
2020–2025	AEK Athens	126	(44)
2025–	Spartak Moscow	36	(6)
2026–	→ Panathinaikos (loan)	10	(0)

International career^{‡}
2012–2013	Trinidad and Tobago U17	4	(0)
2014–2015	Trinidad and Tobago U20	7	(0)
2016–	Trinidad and Tobago	54	(12)
- * Club domestic league appearances and goals as of 14 November 2026 ‡ National team caps and goals as of 30 March 2026

Levi Samuel García (born 20 November 1997) is a Trinidadian professional footballer who plays as a forward for Super League Greece club Panathinaikos on loan from Russian Premier League club Spartak Moscow, and the Trinidad and Tobago national team.

García began his professional football career in 2013, at the age of 15, with T&TEC in his native Trinidad and Tobago. After one season with the Electricity Boys, he completed a free transfer to fellow TT Pro League club Central FC. However, prior to making his first-team debut for the Couva Sharks, Garcia signed with AZ Alkmaar of the Eredivisie in February 2015. After spending two years in Israel, García moved to AEK Athens in 2020.

A popular footballer of the Greek league during his time in Greece, García played both as a winger and as a centre forward. He has been praised for his muscle, his fitness, his dribbling, his tactical prowess and his high jumping.

== Early life ==
García was born on 20 November 1997 in Santa Flora, Trinidad and Tobago to parents Carl and Judith, and comes from a football family consisting of three brothers (Daniel, Nathaniel, and Judah) who have represented different local clubs and two sisters (Carla and Adanna) who are also fans of the sport. In fact, the three brothers would play football in their backyard for hours when younger.

In particular, García credits his early football influence to his eldest brother Daniel after he encouraged Levi to become a better player and rented a car or ordered a taxi to ensure that he attended youth training and matches. His cousin Isaiah Garcia is also a footballer.

At the age of 14, García attended Shiva Boys' Hindu College in Penal, Trinidad and also enrolled in the youth program at former TT Pro League club T&TEC. However, after one season with the Electricity Boys, the club suspended its football operations citing financial difficulties. Over the next two years, Garcia played alternatively for Shiva Boys' Hindu College and local youth club Siparia Spurs.

In 2012, playing as a striker, García led Shiva Boys to the Secondary Schools Football League (SSFL) South Zone title and qualified as one of four schools for the FA Trophy. During the competition, Garcia scored one goal in three appearances to help the Shiva Boys progress in the competition before falling to Central FC in the quarterfinals.

== Club career ==
=== Early career ===
After spending the previous year in the club's youth program, García made his full professional debut for T&TEC of the TT Pro League, at the age of 15, after making appearances during the club's run-in to close the 2012–13 season. Due to the club's severe financial struggles and inability to pay its salaried players, Electricity Boys' manager Dexter Cyrus decided to feature some of its younger players, which included the three Garcia brothers, in Pro League matches.

In March 2014, García signed his first professional contract with Central FC of the TT Pro League on a two-year agreement. However, prior to his first appearance for the club, he was discovered in September 2014 while playing for Trinidad and Tobago during qualification for the 2015 CONCACAF U-20 Championship by Dutch agent Humphry Nijman.

After an initial struggle between Central and Nijman, the two parties came to an agreement through mediation involving the Trinidad and Tobago Football Association to allow Garcia participate for a trial in the Netherlands. Despite this, he still scored one goal for Central FC during the 2013–14 TT Pro League season.

=== AZ Alkmaar ===
García has great speed, a good understanding and a powerful shot in his left foot[...] Levi arrives in November to AZ, where he first must ease into our culture and way of playing football. We see in him mainly a promise for the future.

— Earnie Stewart on signing García to a contract with AZ in February 2015.

On 20 February 2015, García signed a pre-contract agreement for three years with a club option for a two-year extension with AZ Alkmaar of the Eredivisie following a successful trial with the club. However, he was unable to begin his professional career until his eighteenth birthday due to existing European Union labour laws. After several months of difficult negotiations, Garcia's former club Central FC agreed upon an undisclosed transfer fee in June 2015 with AZ.

==== Rapid rise to the first team (2016–2018) ====
During the club's preparation for the 2015–16 season, García received training and special attention from former Dutch international Marco Van Basten who had served as an assistant manager for the club earlier in the year before stepping away for health reasons.

On 24 January 2016, García made his professional and league debut for AZ Alkmaar against Feyenoord after coming on for Dabney dos Santos in the 68th minute with his club leading 4–1. Aged just 18 years and 65 days, García became the youngest Trinidadian footballer to make an appearance for a European club, beating a record previously held by former Aston Villa striker Dwight Yorke.

One week later, he scored his first professional goal in less than a minute after coming on as a 71st-minute substitute in a 3–0 win over NEC Nijmegen to become the club's second youngest ever scorer. In his first season at AZ, García made eight league appearances and nine in all competitions having scored one league goal and recording one assist to help AZ finish fourth in the Eredivisie and qualify for the 2016–17 UEFA Europa League.

==== Jong AZ and Excelsior (2018) ====
After having played for Jong AZ for most of the first half of the 2017–18 season, struggling to make first team appearances, García was sent out on loan to Excelsior Rotterdam, another Eredivisie club, for the remainder of the season.

=== Ironi Kiryat Shmona ===
In May 2018, with his Alkmaar contract due to expire at the end of the season, it was announced García would join Israeli Premier League side Ironi Kiryat Shmona for the 2018–19 season.

=== Beitar Jerusalem ===
On 30 May 2019, García signed to Beitar Jerusalem.

=== AEK Athens ===
On 14 September 2020, AEK Athens signed the 22-year-old international by offering Beitar Jerusalem €2.6 million to acquire 60% of García's rights, plus bonuses. On 27 September 2020, he scored the opening goal of the 3–0 win of AEK Athens against Lamia on his league debut.

On 13 December 2020, García scored with a direct corner kick in a 4–3 away win against Apollon Smyrnis. On 14 January 2021, García scored with a direct free-kick to give his team a 1–0 away win against Aris Thessaloniki. On 20 January 2021, he came in off the bench and sealed a 2–0 home win against Apollon Smyrnis for the first leg of the Greek Cup round of 16. On 28 February 2021, he scored in a 1–1 away draw against Panathinaikos.

His first two seasons in Greece weren't as productive as anticipated, but Matías Almeyda's appointment as the club's new coach at the start of 2022–23 season was crucial to his resurgence. Under the guidance of the Argentine, Levi transformed into a great striker, exploiting his speed and physical qualities. His adaptability and performances have been praised and as a result various clubs, including Villarreal and Celtic, are both keeping tabs on him, while AEK Athens are not willing to accept anything less than €15,000,000.

On 2 August 2023, García signed a new contract with AEK Athens, running until the summer of 2028. His new contract will see him receive a fee of €1,2 million per year, thus ending the efforts of Lens to acquire him.

=== Spartak Moscow ===
On 7 February 2025, García signed a three-and-a-half-year contract with Russian club Spartak Moscow.

==== Loan to Panathanaikos ====
On 5 August 2026, García returned to Greece and joined Panathinaikos on a season-long loan, with an option to buy.

== International career ==
García has represented Trinidad and Tobago on various levels of international competition, having been capped for the under-17, under-20, and the senior team.

=== Youth teams ===
He made his international debut for the under-17 team after replacing Brent Sam in the second half of their final match to help the Soca Warriors earn qualification for the 2013 CONCACAF U-17 Championship. During the continental tournament, he made two consecutive starts in a loss to Canada and in a 2–0 win against Costa Rica to advance to the knockout round. However, following a 4–2 loss to hosts Panama, the Soca Warriors fell one win short of qualifying for the 2013 FIFA U-17 World Cup.

In September 2014, García represented the under-20 team in central midfield en route to winning the 2014 Caribbean Under-20 Championship and qualifying for the 2015 CONCACAF U-20 Championship. Although he made four appearances during the CONCACAF Championship and impressed several European scouts, the Soca Warriors finished a disappointing fourth in their group with just one win and failed to qualify for the 2015 FIFA U-20 World Cup.

=== Senior team ===
García made his full international debut for the national team on 25 March 2016 against Saint Vincent and the Grenadines during qualification for the 2018 FIFA World Cup. García marked his national team debut with a pair of goals in the second half to lead the Soca Warriors to a 3–2 win. Garcia's goals made him Trinidad and Tobago's youngest ever scorer in a FIFA World Cup qualification match at 18 years and 127 days old. Two months later, he made an additional two appearances for the Soca Warriors in losses against Peru and Uruguay.

== Career statistics ==
=== Club ===
As of match played 11 August 2026

Club	Season	League			National cup (Note: Includes KNVB Cup, Israel State Cup, Greek Football Cup, Russian Cup)		League cup (Note: Includes Toto Cup)		Continental		Total	
Club	Season	Division	Apps	Goals	Apps	Goals	Apps	Goals	Apps	Goals	Apps	Goals
AZ	2015–16	Eredivisie	8	1	1	0	—		—		9	1
AZ	2016–17	Eredivisie	18	1	2	0	—		8 (Note: Appearances in UEFA Europa League)	1	28	2
AZ	2017–18	Eredivisie	4	0	2	1	—		—		6	1
AZ	Total		30	2	5	1	—		8	1	43	4
Excelsior (Ioan)	2017–18	Eredivisie	15	1	—		—		—		15	1
Ironi Kiryat Shmona	2018–19	Israeli Premier League	20	3	2	0	5	0	—		27	3
Beitar Jerusalem	2019–20	Israeli Premier League	30	5	3	1	7	0	—		40	6
AEK Athens	2020–21	Super League Greece	26	5	5	1	—		4	0	35	6
AEK Athens	2021–22	Super League Greece	33	7	4	1	—		2 (Note: Appearances in UEFA Conference League)	0	39	8
AEK Athens	2022–23	Super League Greece	31	14	6	4	—		—		37	18
AEK Athens	2023–24	Super League Greece	20	13	1	0	—		6 (Note: Three appearances in UEFA Champions League, three appearances and one goal in UEFA Europa League)	1	27	14
AEK Athens	2024–25	Super League Greece	16	5	3	0	—		3	5	22	10
AEK Athens	Total		126	44	19	6	—		15	6	160	56
Spartak Moscow	2024–25	Russian Premier League	11	1	4	2	—		—		15	3
Spartak Moscow	2025–26	Russian Premier League	25	5	8	2	—		—		33	7
Spartak Moscow	Total		36	6	12	4	—		—		48	10
Panathinaikos	2026–27	Super League Greece	0	0	0	0	—		1	1	1	1
Career total			257	61	41	12	12	0	24	8	334	81

=== International ===
As of match played 13 November 2025

National team	Year	Friendly		Competitive		Total	
National team	Year	Apps	Goals	Apps	Goals	Apps	Goals
Trinidad and Tobago
Trinidad and Tobago	2016	1	0	8	2	9	2 (Note: García additionally played one friendlies in 2016 not recognized by FIFA.)
Trinidad and Tobago	2017	1	0	2	0	4	0 (Note: García additionally played one friendly in 2017 not recognized by FIFA.)
Trinidad and Tobago	2018	0	0	0	0	0	0 (Note: García additionally played two friendlies in 2018 not recognized by FIFA.)
Trinidad and Tobago	2019	1	0	6	0	7	0 (Note: García additionally played three friendlies in 2019 not recognized by FIFA.)
Trinidad and Tobago	2020	0	0	0	0	0	0
Trinidad and Tobago	2021	0	0	4	1	4	1
Trinidad and Tobago	2022	4	4	4	1	8	5
Trinidad and Tobago	2023	0	0	4	0	4	0
Trinidad and Tobago	2024	0	0	2	0	2	0
Trinidad and Tobago	2025	0	0	9	2	9	2
Total		7	4	40	6	47	10

Scores and results list Trinidad and Tobago's goal tally first.

List of international goals scored by Levi García
No.	Date	Venue	Cap	Opponent	Score	Result	Competition
1	25 March 2016	Arnos Vale Stadium, Kingstown, Saint Vincent and the Grenadines	1	Saint Vincent and the Grenadines	2–1	3–2	2018 FIFA World Cup qualification
2	25 March 2016	Arnos Vale Stadium, Kingstown, Saint Vincent and the Grenadines	1	Saint Vincent and the Grenadines	3–2	3–2	2018 FIFA World Cup qualification
3	25 March 2021	Estadio Panamericano, San Cristóbal, Dominican Republic	28	Guyana	1–0	3–0	2022 FIFA World Cup qualification
4	25 March 2022	Hasely Crawford Stadium, Port of Spain, Trinidad and Tobago	32	Barbados	1–0	9–0	Friendly
5	25 March 2022	Hasely Crawford Stadium, Port of Spain, Trinidad and Tobago	32	Barbados	3–0	9–0	Friendly
6	25 March 2022	Hasely Crawford Stadium, Port of Spain, Trinidad and Tobago	32	Barbados	4–0	9–0	Friendly
7	29 March 2022	Hasely Crawford Stadium, Port of Spain, Trinidad and Tobago	33	Guyana	1–1	1–1	Friendly
8	10 June 2022	Arnos Vale Stadium, Arnos Vale, Saint Vincent and the Grenadines	36	Saint Vincent and the Grenadines	2–0	2–0	2022–23 CONCACAF Nations League B
9	6 June 2025	Hasely Crawford Stadium, Port of Spain, Trinidad and Tobago	46	Saint Kitts and Nevis	1–0	6–2	2026 FIFA World Cup qualification
10	10 June 2025	Estadio Nacional, San José, Costa Rica	47	Costa Rica	1–2	1–2	2026 FIFA World Cup qualification
11	30 March 2026	Pakhtakor Central Stadium, Tashkent, Uzbekistan	54	Gabon	1–1	2–2 (2–3 p)	2026 FIFA Series
12	30 March 2026	Pakhtakor Central Stadium, Tashkent, Uzbekistan	54	Gabon	2–2	2–2 (2–3 p)	2026 FIFA Series
13	24 September 2026	Sabina Park, Kingston, Jamaica	55	Haiti	2–1	3–2	2026–27 CONCACAF Nations League A

== Honours ==
Beitar Jerusalem

- Israeli Toto Cup: 2019–20

AEK Athens

- Super League Greece: 2022–23
- Greek Cup: 2022–23

Spartak Moscow

- Russian Cup: 2025–26

Trinidad and Tobago U20

- CFU U-20 Tournament: 2014

Individual

- Youngest Trinidadian professional footballer in Europe: 18 years and 65 days
- Youngest Trinidadian professional goalscorer in Europe: 18 years and 71 days
- Youngest player to play for Trinidad and Tobago in a FIFA World Cup qualification match: 18 years and 127 days
- AEK Athens Player of the Season: 2020–21
- Super League Greece Team of the Season: 2020–21, 2022–23
