= Wangkhei Assembly constituency =

Legislative Assembly constituency in Manipur State, India

Coordinates: 24.79°N 93.95°E

Wangkhei
- Constituency No. 15 for the Manipur Legislative Assembly
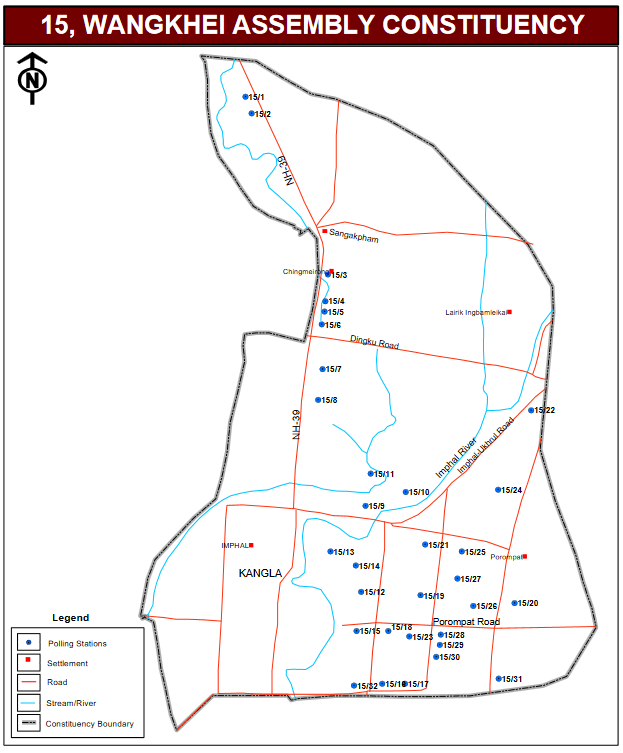

Constituency details
- Country: India
- Region: Northeast India
- State: Manipur
- District: Imphal East
- Lok Sabha constituency: Inner Manipur
- Established: 1967
- Total electors: 37,235
- Reservation: None

Member of Legislative Assembly
- 12th Manipur Legislative Assembly
- Incumbent Thangjam Arunkumar
- Party: Bharatiya Janata Party
- Elected year: 2022

Wangkhei is one of the 60 Legislative Assembly constituencies of Manipur state in India.

It is part of Imphal East district.

== Birth and extent of the constituency ==
Wangkhei was created for the first legislative assembly election in Manipur, in 1967. As of the latest delimitation in 2007, it comprises Ward Nos. 21, 22, 23 and 26 in Imphal municipality.

Wangkhei is assigned number 15 among the 60 assembly constituencies of Manipur. It consists of 50 parts namely: 1 - Mantri Pukhri West (A), 2 - Mantri Pukhri West (B), 3 - Mantri Pukhri East (A), 4 - Mantri Pukhri East (B), 5 - Chingmeirong Nongchup(A), 6 - Chingmeirong Nongchup(B), 7 - Chingmeirong Nongpok (A), 8 - Chingmeirong Nongpok (B), 9 - Chingmeirong Nongpok(B-1), 10 - Chingmeirong Nongpok (C), 11 - Kabo Leikai Nongpok (A), 12 - Kabo Leikai Nongpok (B), 13 - Kabo Leikai Nongpok (C), 14 - Kabo Leikai Nongpok (D), 15 - Kabo Leikai Nongpok (E), 16 - Golapati (North), 17 - Golapati (South), 18 - Nongpok Ingkhol (C), 19 - Nongpok Ingkhol (D), 20 - Nongpok Ingkhol (A), 21 - Nongpok Ingkhol (B), 22 - Wangkheirakpam Leikai, 23 - Wangkheirakpam Leikai (E), 24 - Nongpok Ingkhol(F-2), 25 - New Chekon (A), 26 - New Chekon (B), 27 - Hafiz Hatta, 28 - Konjeng Poila Leikai, 29 - Telipati (A), 30 - Telipati (B), 31 - Khurai Thoudam Leikai (A), 32 - Khurai Thoudam Leikai (B), 33 - Khurai Thangjam Leikai (A), 34 - Khurai Thangjam Leikai (B), 35 - Khurai Thangjam Leikai (C), 36 - Khurai Thangjam Leikai (D), 37 - Khurai Ahongei Leikai (A), 38 - Khurai Ahongei Leikai, 39 - Khurai Soibam Leikai (A), 40 - Khurai Soibam Leikai (B), 41 - Khurai Soibam Leikai (C), 42 - Khurai Soibam Leikai (D), 43 - Wangkheirakpam Leikai (A), 44 - Wangkheirakpam Leikai (A-1), 45 - Wangkheirakpam Leikai (B), 46 - Wangkheirakpam Leikai (B-1), 47 - Wangkheirakpam Leikai (C), 48 - Wangkheirakpam Leikai (D), 49 - Wangkhei Angom Leikai (A), and 50 - Wangkhei Angom Leikai (B).

== Members of the Legislative Assembly ==
Year	Member	Party
1980	Yumkham Erabot Singh	Janata Party
1984	Yumkham Erabot Singh	Indian National Congress
1990	Dr. Haobam Borobabu Singh	Manipur Peoples Party
1995	Yumkham Erabot Singh	Indian National Congress
2000	Dr. Haobam Borobabu Singh	Bharatiya Janata Party
2002	Yumkham Erabot Singh	Manipur State Congress Party
2007	Yumkham Erabot Singh	Indian National Congress
2012	Yumkham Erabot Singh	Indian National Congress
2017	~~Okram Henry Singh~~ (Note: Okram Henry Singh's election was declared null and void by the High Court of Manipur.)	Indian National Congress
2017	Yumkham Erabot Singh	Bharatiya Janata Party
2022	Thangjam Arunkumar	Bharatiya Janata Party

== Election results ==
=== 2027 Assembly election ===
2027 Manipur Legislative Assembly election: Wangkhei
Party	Candidate	Votes	%	±%
INC				
NDA				
NOTA	None of the above			
Majority				
Turnout				
gain from		Swing		

=== 2017 ===
Okram Henry Singh was declared as the winner in 2017, but on 15 April 2021, the Manipur High Court declared the election result as null and void. It also declared that Yumkham Erabot Singh was the MLA of the Wangkhei constituency.

Manipur Legislative Assembly Election, 2017: Wangkhei
Party	Candidate	Votes	%	±%
INC	Okram Henry Singh	16,753		
BJP	Yumkham Erabot Singh	12,417		
AITC	Rajkumar Priyobarta Singh	341		
NOTA	None of the Above	149		
Majority		4,336	14.62	
Turnout		29,660	84.95	
Registered electors		34,914		

== See also ==
- List of constituencies of the Manipur Legislative Assembly
- Imphal East district
