= Nathaniel García =

Trinidadian footballer

Personal information
- Date of birth: 24 April 1993 (age 33)
- Place of birth: Santa Flora, Trinidad and Tobago
- Position: Midfielder

Team information
- Current team: Prison Service

Senior career*
| Years | Team | Apps | (Gls) |
| 2012–2013 | T&TEC Sports Club | | (3) |
| 2014–2017 | Central FC | | (3) |
| 2017–2019 | Point Fortin | | (8) |
| 2019–2020 | Gokulam Kerala | 15 | (3) |
| 2020–2021 | NEROCA | 10 | (0) |
| 2021–2022 | Friends Club | 12 | (4) |
| 2022 | Point Fortin | | |
| 2022 | Sporting Ilam De Mechi | | |
| 2022–2023 | Point Fortin | | |
| 2023–2024 | Defence Force | | |
| 2024–2025 | AC Port of Spain | | |
| 2025– | Prison Service | | |

International career
| 2015–2017 | Trinidad and Tobago U22 | 3 | (1) |
| 2018–2024 | Trinidad and Tobago | 8 | (0) |
- * Club domestic league appearances and goals

Nathaniel García (born 24 April 1993) is a Trinidadian professional football player who plays as a midfielder for TT Pro League club Prison Service.

== Career ==
=== Gokulam Kerala ===
In September 2019, Nathaniel García signed for Indian I-League club Gokulam Kerala.

=== NEROCA ===
In November 2020, Nathaniel García signed for Indian I-League club NEROCA.

=== Friends Club ===
García scored 4 goals for Nepali side Friends Club in the 2021 Martyr's Memorial A-Division League.

== Personal life ==
García is the brother of Daniel García, Judah García and Levi García, as well as a cousin of Isaiah García.

== Career statistics ==
=== Club ===
Statistics accurate as of 24 August 2019

| Club | Season | League | | | Cup | | | AFC | | | Total | | |
| Club | Season | Apps | Goals | Assists | Apps | Goals | Assists | Apps | Goals | Assists | Apps | Goals | Assists |
|---|---|---|---|---|---|---|---|---|---|---|---|---|---|
| Gokulam | 2019–20 | 8 | 0 | 0 | 0 | 0 | 0 | 3 | 2 | 0 | 11 | 2 | 0 |
| Career total | | 8 | 0 | 0 | 0 | 0 | 0 | 3 | 2 | 0 | 11 | 2 | 0 |

== Honours ==
Central

- TT Pro League: 2014–15
