= Okram Henry Singh =

Indian politician

Municipal Administration, Housing and Urban Development. Social Welfare. Cooperation Government of Manipur
- In office September 2020 – March 2021

Member of Manipur Legislative Assembly
- In office 2017–2020
- Preceded by: Yumkham Erabot Singh
- Succeeded by: Yumkham Erabot Singh
- Constituency: Wangkhei

Personal details
- Born: Okram Henry Singh
- Party: Bharatiya Janata Party
- Other political affiliations: Indian National Congress
- Relations: Okram Ibobi Singh (uncle)
- Profession: Businessman

Okram Henry Singh is an Indian politician from Manipur and member of the Bharatiya Janata Party. He was elected as a member of the Manipur Legislative Assembly from Wangkhei constituency in Imphal East District from the Indian National Congress in 2017 Manipur Legislative Assembly election. In 2021, he was defeated by Thangjam Arunkumar Singh by a huge margin of votes. He is a nephew of former Chief Minister of Manipur Okram Ibobi Singh.

During the 2020 Manipur vote of confidence, he was one of the eight MLAs who had skipped the assembly proceedings defying the party whip for the trust vote. He resigned from Indian National Congress and later joined Bharatiya Janata Party in the presence of Ram Madhav, Baijayant Panda and Chief Minister of Manipur N. Biren Singh.

In the recent verdict declared by the High Court of Manipur, his election result was declared null and void for concealing vital information, including criminal antecedents.
