= Thangmeiband =

Thangmeiband is a region in Imphal city, Manipur, India, which has a population of about 50,000. Thangmeiband is one of the 60 constituencies which elect the Manipur Legislative Assembly.

== Thangmeiband Assembly Constituency ==
As an assembly constituency, Thangmeiband Constituency is the 9th among 60 constituencies of Manipur. It comprises 42 parts.
