= Judah García =

Trinidadian footballer (born 2000)

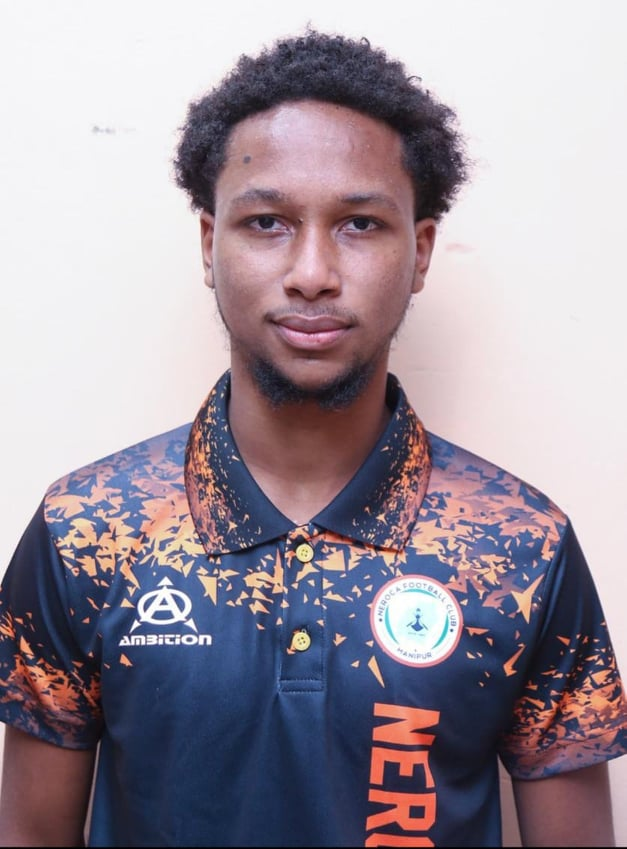
- Garcia with NEROCA in 2021

Personal information
- Full name: Judah Emmanuel García
- Date of birth: 24 October 2000 (age 26)
- Place of birth: San Fernando, Trinidad and Tobago
- Height: 1.82 m (6 ft 0 in)
- Position: Attacking midfielder

Team information
- Current team: Ilioupoli
- Number: 14

Senior career*
Years	Team	Apps	(Gls)
2018–2020	Point Fortin		
2020–2021	NEROCA	12	(4)
2021–2025	AEK Athens B	77	(9)
2025–2026	Partizani Tirana	9	(0)
2026–	Ilioupoli	11	(1)

International career^{‡}
2018	Trinidad and Tobago U20	7	(1)
2018	Trinidad and Tobago U22	3	(0)
2018–	Trinidad and Tobago	15	(3)
- * Club domestic league appearances and goals as of 26 April 2026 ‡ National team caps and goals as of 10:11, 20 June 2025 (UTC)

Judah Emmanuel García (born 24 October 2000) is a Trinidadian professional footballer who plays as an attacking midfielder for Super League Greece 2 club Ilioupoli and the Trinidad and Tobago national team.

== Club career ==
Garcia born in Santa Flora, Trinidad and Tobago. He comes from a football family consisting of three brothers (Daniel, Nathaniel, and Levi) all play professional football. García joined junior team of Point Fortin in 2017 and later joined senior team.

=== NEROCA ===
In November 2020, Imphal based club NEROCA completed the signing of Trinidad and Tobago international, Judah García for 2020–21 season of I-League. He scored 3 goals in 12 league matches as NEROCA were relegated, but were reinstated by AIFF after the viewing the situation of the COVID-19 pandemic.

=== AEK Athens B ===
On 3 August 2021, Judah joined AEK Athens B on a three-year contract.

== International career ==
=== Youth ===
García has represented Trinidad and Tobago at Trinidad and Tobago U20 and Trinidad and Tobago U22 levels.

=== Senior ===
Following his impressive season with Point Fortin, García was included by manager Dennis Lawrence in a friendly game against Panama. He made his debut after coming off the bench in the 81st minute, replacing Marcus Joseph.

== Career statistics ==
=== Club ===
As of 9 September 2023

Club	Season	League			Cup		Continental		Other		Total	
Club	Season	Division	Apps	Goals	Apps	Goals	Apps	Goals	Apps	Goals	Apps	Goals
NEROCA	2020–21	I-League	12	4	0	0	—		—		12	4
AEK Athens B	2021–22	Super League Greece 2	30	2	—		—		—		30	2
AEK Athens B	2022–23	Super League Greece 2	12	3	—		—		—		12	3
AEK Athens B	Total		42	5	—		—		—		42	5
Career total			54	9	0	0	0	0	0	0	54	9

International goals

Judah García's international goals for Trinidad and Tobago
#	Date	Venue	Opponent	Score	Result	Competition
1.	2 July 2021	DRV PNK Stadium, Fort Lauderdale, United States	Montserrat	4–1	6–1	2021 CONCACAF Gold Cup qualification
2.	13 June 2022	Hasely Crawford Stadium, Port of Spain, Trinidad and Tobago	Saint Vincent and the Grenadines	1–0	4–1	2022–23 CONCACAF Nations League B
3.	22 September 2022	700th Anniversary Stadium, Chiang Mai, Thailand	Tajikistan	1–0	1–2	2022 King's Cup

== Personal life ==
Judah García is the younger brother of Daniel Garcia, Nathaniel García and Levi García, as well as a cousin of Isaiah García.
