= Surjakumar Okram =

Indian politician

Member of the Manipur Legislative Assembly
- Incumbent
- Assumed office 2017
- Preceded by: Okram Landhoni Devi
- Constituency: Khangabok

Personal details
- Born: 10 January 1988 (age 38) Manipur, India
- Party: Indian National Congress
- Parent(s): Okram Ibobi Singh; Okram Landhoni Devi

Surjakumar Okram (born 10 January 1988) is an Indian politician from Manipur. He is a Member of Manipur Legislative Assembly from Khangabok, representing the Indian National Congress.
