= Okram Ibobi Singh =

11th Chief Minister of Manipur

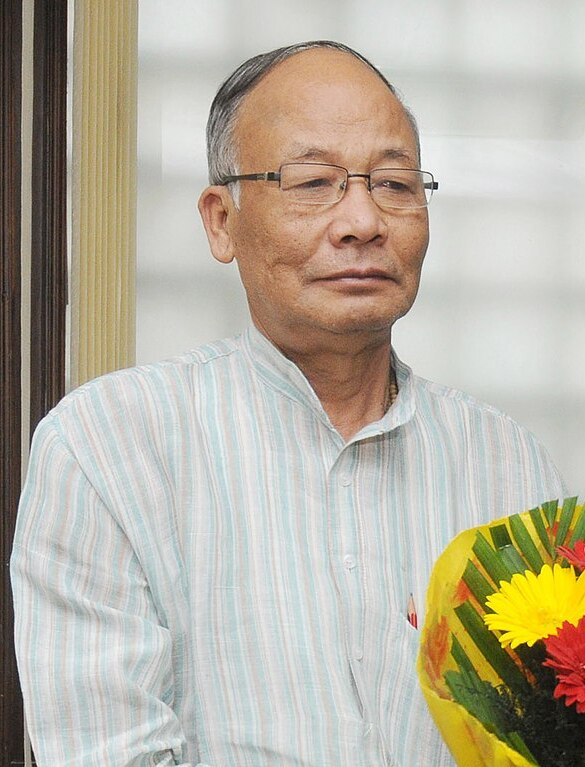
- Singh in 2022

President Manipur Pradesh Congress Committee
- Incumbent
- Assumed office 5 February 2026
- Preceded by: Keisham Meghachandra Singh

Leader of the Opposition of the Manipur Legislative Assembly
- In office 15 March 2017 – 30 March 2022
- Preceded by: O. Joy Singh (Manipur People's Party)
- Succeeded by: Vacant

11th Chief Minister of Manipur
- In office 7 March 2002 – 15 March 2017
- Deputy Chief Minister: Gaikhangam Gangmei (from 2012)
- Preceded by: Radhabinod Koijam
- Succeeded by: Nongthombam Biren Singh

Member of the Manipur Legislative Assembly
- Incumbent
- Assumed office 2007
- Constituency: Thoubal
- In office 2002–2007
- Constituency: Khangabok
- In office 1984–1995
- Constituency: Khangabok

Personal details
- Born: 19 June 1948 (age 78) Athokpam, Manipur, India
- Party: Indian National Congress
- Spouse: Landhoni Devi
- Relations: Okram Henry Singh (Nephew) Surjakumar Okram (Son)
- Occupation: Politician

Okram Ibobi Singh (born 19 June 1948) is an Indian Politician who is currently serving as a member of the Manipur Legislative Assembly representing Thoubal Assembly constituency since 2007, from Khangabok Assembly constituency from 2002 to 2007 and from 1984 to 1995. He also served as the 11th Chief Minister of Manipur from 2002 to 2017 and the and also served as leader of the house in legislative assembly and Leader of the Opposition, Manipur Legislative Assembly from 2017 to 2022 as a member of the Indian National Congress.

== Political career ==
Ibobi is credited with bringing stability to the state government after a long time as he completed a full term since Rishang Keising. While many praise him for bringing political stability and development, his 15 years of rule as Chief Minister is also not free from controversies. There are many alleged fake encounter cases in Manipur, especially those associated with insurgent groups.

The ILP movement in 2015 led by the Joint Committee on Inner Line Permit System (JCILPS) caused long days of public curfew and general strikes. His policy to create seven additional districts in Manipur was not well accepted by Nagas of Manipur and led to 2016 Manipur unrest which led to one of the longest economic blockades in a state in the history of India.

== Early life ==
Okram Ibobi Singh was born to Okram Angoubi and Lukamani Devi to a Meitei Hindu family at Athokpam, Thoubal district. He is the oldest child and has five brothers and three sisters. He was born to a poor family and helped with his father's profession. He did his graduation from D.M. College, Imphal. He is married to L. Landhoni Devi, who has won two consecutive elections of Manipur Legislative Assembly from Khangabok Constituency of Thoubal district. She is also the first woman MLA of Thoubal district.

== Assassination attempt ==
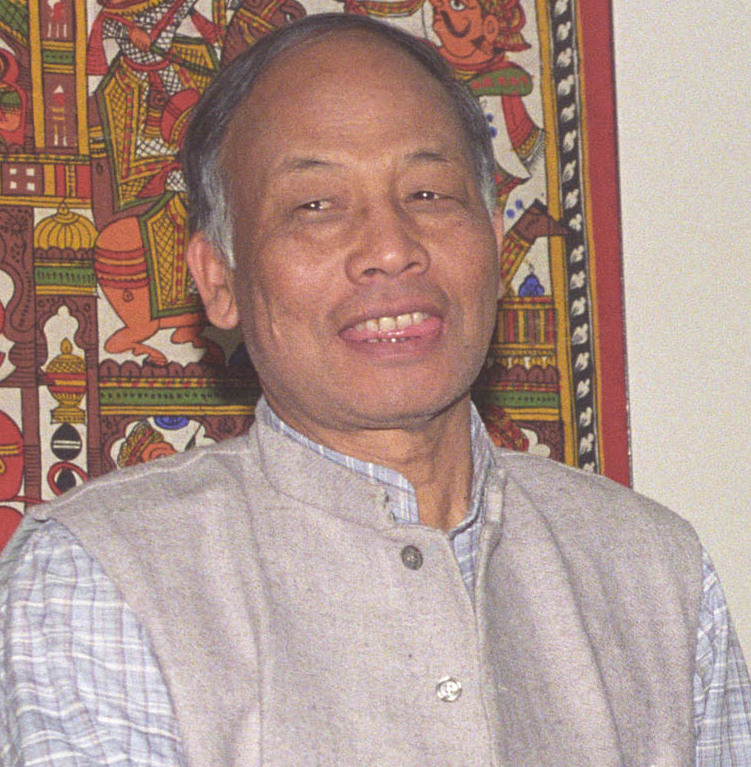
Singh in New Delhi

In November 2006, Okram Ibobi Singh's residence was attacked by the terrorist organization - People's Revolutionary Party of Kangleipak (PREPAK).

On 2 September 2008, militants again attacked Shri Ibobi's official residence at Babupara, Imphal while he was sleeping. One security guard was injured in the attack, but Singh was unharmed. A member of the PREPAK claimed responsibility for the attack via phone and indicated it was meant as a warning to Singh to stop policies meant to thwart the insurgency in Manipur.

== Leaked allegations ==
In a September 2006 leaked diplomatic cable, Henry V. Jardine, Principal Officer, U.S. Consulate General, Kolkata, reported the Chief Minister as "Mr. Ten Percent" for the amount of money he takes from contracts and government projects.

Political offices
Preceded by President's rule	Chief Minister of Manipur; 7 March 2002 – 14 March 2017	Succeeded by Nongthombam Biren Singh
