= Yumkham Erabot Singh =

Indian politician

Yumkham Erabot Singh is a politician from Manipur, India. He was elected to the Manipur Legislative Assembly as the Indian National Congress candidate in the Wangkhei constituency, for the first time in 1980.

In September 2016, Singh announced leaving the Indian National Congress and joined Bharatiya Janata Party ahead of 2017 Manipur Legislative Assembly election.
