= Khogen Singh Wangkhem =

Indian footballer and coach

Khogen Singh
Personal information
- Full name: Khogen Singh Wangkhem
- Date of birth: 1 February 1971 (age 55)
- Place of birth: Manipur, India
- Position: Left back

Senior career*
Years	Team	Apps	(Gls)
- Air India
- ITI
- Salgaocar
- Mumbai
- Tollygunge Agragami

Managerial career
- 2017–2018: Minerva Punjab
- 2021–2023: NEROCA
- 2023–2024: Kshetri Iril Mapal
- 2024–2025: Southern Sporting Union
- 2025: Nagaland United
- 2026–: Karbi Anglong Morning Star
- * Club domestic league appearances and goals

Khogen Singh Wangkhem (Meitei: Wangkhem Khogen Singh, born 1 February 1971) is an Indian football coach and former player, who serves as the head coach of Karbi Anglong Morning Star.

== Playing career ==
Born in Manipur, Singh has played for a variety of clubs including Air India, Salgaocar, Mumbai, and Tollygunge Agragami.

== Coaching career ==
=== Minerva Punjab: 2017–2018 ===
Prior to the start of the 2017–18 I-League season, Singh was appointed head coach of Minerva Punjab. By the end of the campaign, Singh had led the club to their first ever national league title in only their second season in India's top flight. Despite the success however, Singh left the club on 22 May 2018 after being told he would be demoted to a youth coaching role.

=== NEROCA FC: 2021–present ===
In July 2021, He is appointed as the head coach of inleague club NEROCA for the upcoming season. In 2022, he guided NEROCA in "Imphal Derby" at the Group-C opener during the 131st edition of Durand Cup, clinching a thrilling 3–1 win.

== Statistics ==
=== Managerial statistics ===
As of 3 November 2018.

Team	From	To	Record				
Team	From	To	G	W	D	L	Win %
(India) Minerva Punjab	2017	22 May 2018	19	11	3	5	57.89
Total			19	11	3	5	57.89

== Honours ==
Minerva Punjab

- I-League: 2017–18
