= Prakash Budhathoki =

Nepalese footballer

Personal information
- Full name: Prakash Budhathoki
- Date of birth: 21 May 1993 (age 33)
- Place of birth: Dharan, Sunsari, Nepal
- Height: 1.67 m (5 ft 5 1/2 in)
- Position: Midfielder

Team information
- Current team: Butwal Lumbini F.C.

Senior career*
Years	Team	Apps	(Gls)
2011–2013	Friends Club	15	(5)
2013– 2018	Three Star Club	26	(11)
2021	NEROCA	6	(0)

International career
2013–	Nepal	5	(0)
- * Club domestic league appearances and goals

Prakash Budhathoki (Nepali: प्रकाश बुढाथोकी) (born 21 May 1993) is a Nepali professional footballer from Dharan, Patnali, Sunsari, who plays as a midfielder.

== International career ==
Budhathoki played his first official international game with the senior national team on 31 August 2013 in the 2013 SAFF Championship against Bangladesh (2–0), where he played the second half as he came in as a substitute for Jagjit Shrestha. He scored a free kick in SAG 2016 final against India in Guwahati.

== Club career ==
He has started his club career from Friends Club in 2011. And then moved to Three Star Club with a 1-year contract. In the 2013 AFC President's Cup group stages in a match against Taiwan Power Company on 11 May Budhathoki scored to give the Three Star Club a 2-0 lead. Taiwan Power Company would come back to draw 2-2 but the Three Star Club would still advance to the second round.
