= Churachand Singh Trophy =

Football tournament in India

- Organiser(s): All Manipur Football Association
- Founded: 1950; 76 years ago
- Region: India
- Teams: Various
- Current champions: Anouba Imagi Mangal (1st title)
- Most championships: Assam Rifles (9 titles)
- 2026

Churachand Singh Trophy, also known as the Churachand Singh Invitation Trophy (Sir Churachand Singh KCSI CBE Memorial Football Tournament), is an annual Indian football tournament held in Manipur and organized by All Manipur Football Association (AMFA).

== History ==
The tournament was first started in 1950 and is named after Manipur's Maharaja Churachand Singh. At its every inception, the Tournament had been organised by the Manipur Sports Association (MSA). With the amalgamation of Manipur Sports Association and Manipur Olympic Association in 1954, the Tournament came under the management of All Manipur Football Association. Apart from some top clubs from Manipur, clubs from neighbouring states also have participated.

Assam Rifles have won the tournament for a record nine times. The current champions are NEROCA FC who won their 6th title by defeating Southern Sporting Union at the 62nd edition of the tournament in 2020.

== Trophy ==
The Winner's Trophy was donated by the former King Bodhchandra Singh in memory of his father and is a gold plated Shield.

== Venues ==
The matches of the tournament are held in multiple venues in Manipur and final is played at Khuman Lampak Main Stadium.

== Results ==
Year	Champions	Score	Runners-up	Ref.
1950	Assam Rifles 4th Bn	–	Manipur XI	
1951	Manipur XI	–	Taren Assam	
1952	Assam Rifles 4th Bn	–	Manipur XI	
1953	Tangkhul SA	–	Dibrugarh DSA	
1954	Assam Rifles 4th Bn	–	Margherita	
1955	Margherita	–	Silchar DSA	
1956	NACO, Nambul Mapal	–	Kuki SC	
1957	Assam Rifles 4th Bn	–	Imphal SC	
1958	Kohima XI	–	Golaghat DSA	
1959	Assam Rifles 4th Bn	–	Imphal SC	
1960	TRAU	–	Assam Rifles 4th Bn	
1961	TRAU	–	NACO, Nambul Mapal	
1963	NACO, Nambul Mapal	–	TRAU	
1964	YAC, Yaiskul	–	TRAU	
1965	Zeliangrong	–	TRAU	
1966	Imphal SC	–	YAC, Yaiskul	
1967	Eastern Sporting Union	–	Imphal SC	
1968	Assam Rifles	–	Thermal SC	
1969	Assam Rifles	–	NISA, Thangmeiband	
1970	Assam Rifles	–	TRAU	
1971	Tournament abandoned			
1972	IBSA and Eastern Sporting Union (joint winners)			
1973	Manipur Police and USA, Khurai (joint winners)			
1974	TRAU	–	Eastern Sporting Union	
1975	Aryan	–	Rajasthan Club	
1976	Young Physique's Union	–	Manipur Police	
1977	Manipur Police	–	Young Physique's Union	
1978	Manipur Police	–	Young Physique's Union	
1980	Manipur Police	–	Young Physique's Union	
1981	TRAU (by court order)			
1983	Young Physique's Union	–	Nagaland Police SC	
1985	Border Security Force	–	Southern Sporting Union	
1986	Manipur Police	–	Southern Sporting Union	
1987	Tournament abandoned			
1988	Manipur Police	–	TRAU	
1989	Manipur Police	–	TRAU	
1991	NACO, Nambul Mapal	–	Manipur Police	
1993	USA, Khurai	–	unknown	
1994	unknown	–	NISA, Thangmeiband	
1999	unknown	–	YSWA, Utlou	
2000	NEROCA	–	unknown	
2001	Southern Sporting Union	1–0	Manipur Police	
2002–03	Eastern Sporting Union	2–1	NEROCA	
2003–04	Southern Sporting Union	–	Citizen's Club	
2004	TRAU	2–0	Youth Welfare Club	
2005–06	Southern Sporting Union	1–0	Manipur Police	
2006	Southern Sporting Union	4–0	Nagaland Police SC	
2007	NISA, Thangmeiband	2–0	AMOFA, Moirang	
2008	Assam Rifles	0–0, (4–2 p)	NEROCA	
2012–13	NEROCA	0–0, (3–1 p)	Assam Regiment Center Shillong	
2013–14	Tiddim Road Unique Gamy Players Union	3–1	TRAU	
2014–15	NEROCA	3–1	Southern Sporting Union	
2016	NEROCA	5–1	Assam Regiment Center Shillong	
2018–19	NEROCA	7–0	Sagolband United FC	
2019	NEROCA	1–1, (3–2 p)	Southern Sporting Union	
2022	Sagolband United FC	0–0, (4–1 p)	Southern Sporting Union	
2023–25	Not held			
2025–26	Anouba Imagi Mangal	1–1, (3–1 p)	Utlou FC	
