= Southern Sporting Union =

- Full name: Southern Sporting Union
- Founded: 1977; 49 years ago
- League: Manipur State League

Southern Sporting Union, also known as SSU, is an Indian professional football club based in Imphal, Manipur. It participates in Manipur State League, top division football league in Manipur.

== Honours ==
=== League ===
- Manipur State League
  - Champions (1): 2012
- Manipur Premier League
  - Champions (2): 2023–24, 2025–26

=== Cup ===
- Churachand Singh Trophy
  - Champions (4): 2001, 2003–04, 2005–06, 2006
  - Runners-up (4): 1985, 1986, 2014–15, 2019
- Shahid Manoranjan Memorial Tournament
  - Champions (1): 2021
- Tiddim Invitation Football Trophy
  - Champions (1): 2005

== See also ==
- List of football clubs in Manipur
- Sports in Manipur
- Northeast Derby (India)
