= All Manipur Football Association =

State governing body of Football in Manipur

- Sport: Football
- Jurisdiction: Manipur
- Membership: 16 district associations
- Abbreviation: AMFA
- Founded: 1973
- Affiliation: All India Football Federation (AIFF)
- Headquarters: Imphal
- President: M. Ratan Kumar Singh
- Secretary: L. Jyotirmoy Roy

The All Manipur Football Association (AMFA) is the state governing body of football in Manipur. It is affiliated with the All India Football Federation, the national governing body. It sends state teams for Santosh Trophy and Rajmata Jijabai Trophy. The AMFA's Manipur State League is the highest football level tournament in Manipur.

== State teams ==
=== Men ===
- Manipur football team
- Manipur under-20 football team
- Manipur under-15 football team
- Manipur under-13 football team

=== Women ===
- Manipur women's football team
- Manipur women's under-19 football team
- Manipur women's under-17 football team

== Affiliated district associations ==
All 16 districts of Manipur are affiliated with the All Manipur Football Association.

No.	Association	District	President
1	Bishnupur District Football Association	Bishnupur	
2	Chandel District Football Association	Chandel	
3	Churachandpur Football Association	Churachandpur	
4	Imphal East District Football Association	Imphal East	
5	Imphal West District Football Association	Imphal West	
6	Jiribam District Football Association	Jiribam	
7	Kakching District Football Association	Kakching	
8	Kamjong District Football Association	Kamjong	
9	Kangpokpi District Football Association	Kangpokpi	
10	Noney District Football Association	Noney	
11	Pherzawl District Football Association	Pherzawl	
12	Senapati District Football Association	Senapati	
13	Tamenglong District Football Association	Tamenglong	
14	Tengnoupal District Football Association	Tengnoupal	
15	Thoubal District Football Association	Thoubal	
16	Ukhrul District Football Association	Ukhrul	

== Competitions ==
=== Club level ===
==== Men's ====
- Manipur Premier League
- Manipur State League
- AMFA Cup
- Thangjam Birchandra-Maipakpi Memorial Winners' Cup
- Churachand Singh Trophy
- Col. Kshetrimayum Arunkumar Memorial Inter Club Futsal Tournament

==== Women's ====
- Manipur Women's League

== Manipur Football League pyramid ==
Level	State leagues																
1	Manipur Premier League promotion (to I-League 3) ↑↓ relegation																
2	AMFA Cup promotion ↑↓ relegation																
3	Thangjam Birchandra-Maipakpi Memorial Winners' Cup promotions ↑↓ relegations																
	District leagues																
	District level	Kakching	Churachandpur	Imphal East	Imphal West	Thoubal	Bishnupur	Chandel	Jiribam	Kangpokpi (Sadar Hills)	Senapati	Kamjong	Pherzawl	Noney	Temanglong	Tengnoupal	Ukhrul
4	1	Leihao Memorial Super Division	Lianboi Simte	R.K. Ghanendrajit Memorial Super Division	S. Birendra Singh Memorial Super Division	Super Division	Super Division	Super Division	Super Division	(L) K.Hangsing Memorial Sadar Hills Super Division	Super Division						
5	2	Kishorkumar Memorial First Division	Khaikhanlian Memorial District First Division	L. Sangita Devi Memorial First Division	Moirangthem Ibobi Memorial First Division	First Division	1 division										
6	3	Naorem Gandhar Memorial Second Division	2 divisions				1 division										
7	4	Krishnamohon Memorial Third Division	2 divisions				1 division										

== Officers ==
AMFA office bearers
President	M. Ratan Kumar
Vice-president	K. Mohori Singh; K. Baruni Singh; Lalvulien Joute; K. Yaima Singh; Tongjahao Kipgen; L. Dinamani Singh
Secretary	L. Jyotirmoy Roy
Treasurer	L. Dinamani Singh
Joint secretary	L. Jyotirmoy Roy

== See also ==
- List of Indian state football associations
- Football in India
- North East Premier League (India)
