= Punjab Ekta Party =

Indian political party

- Abbreviation: PEP
- Leader: Sukhpal Singh Khaira
- Founder: Sukhpal Singh Khaira
- Founded: 8 January 2019
- Dissolved: 17 June 2021
- Split from: Aam Aadmi Party
- Merged into: Indian National Congress
- Youth wing: Punjab Ekta Youth Wing
- Ideology: Regionalism
- Political position: Center-left
- Colours: Yellow Green
- Alliance: Punjab Democratic Alliance

Election symbol
- Yellow Green

The Punjab Ekta Party was a political party in India, founded by Sukhpal Singh Khaira on 8 January 2019. It was a Punjab-centric regional party which later merged with Indian National Congress on 17 June 2021.

== History ==
- Sukhpal Khaira was elected in 2017 from the Bholath constituency on the ticket of the Aam Aadmi Party. After the resignation of H. S. Phoolka as Leader of the Opposition in the Punjab Assembly, Khaira was appointed as his replacement. However, due to differences with central leadership he was eventually sacked from the post.
- On 6 January 2019 he resigned from the Aam Aadmi Party and on 8 January formed new party. He also declared interest in making an electoral coalition with like -minded parties in Punjab for the 2019 Lok Sabha elections.

== Ideology ==
As per Khaira, it is a party to "liberate Punjab from the clutches of corrupt traditional parties" of Punjab.

- It is a Punjab-centric party which promises to end corruption, sand mining, transport, cable mafia, provide justice in the 2015 Guru Granth Sahib sacrilege case, and stop police firing incidents.
- The Party has raised alarm on the prevailing water crisis in the state. While Khaira has expressed concern on the dwindling groundwater levels mainly caused by excessive irrigation and heavy use of pesticides, he has also blamed the previous and the current governments of both the state and the center for giving water to Rajasthan and Haryana states from Punjab's share in an arbitrary manner and also failing to implement crop diversification and water saving irrigation techniques.

== Parliamentary elections, 2019 ==
For the 2019 general elections, the party announced, party contested on 3 out of 13 Lok Sabha seats for the 2019 election in Punjab along with other member parties of the Punjab Democratic Alliance. The three seats were:

- Bathinda
- Faridkot
- Khadoor Sahib.
