= Bholath Assembly constituency =

Legislative Assembly constituency in Punjab State, India

Coordinates: 31.54°N 75.51°E

Bholath
- Constituency No. 26 for the Punjab Legislative Assembly

Constituency details
- Country: India
- State: Punjab
- District: Kapurthala
- Lok Sabha constituency: Hoshiarpur
- Total electors: 136,413 (in 2022)
- Reservation: None

Member of Legislative Assembly
- 16th Punjab Legislative Assembly
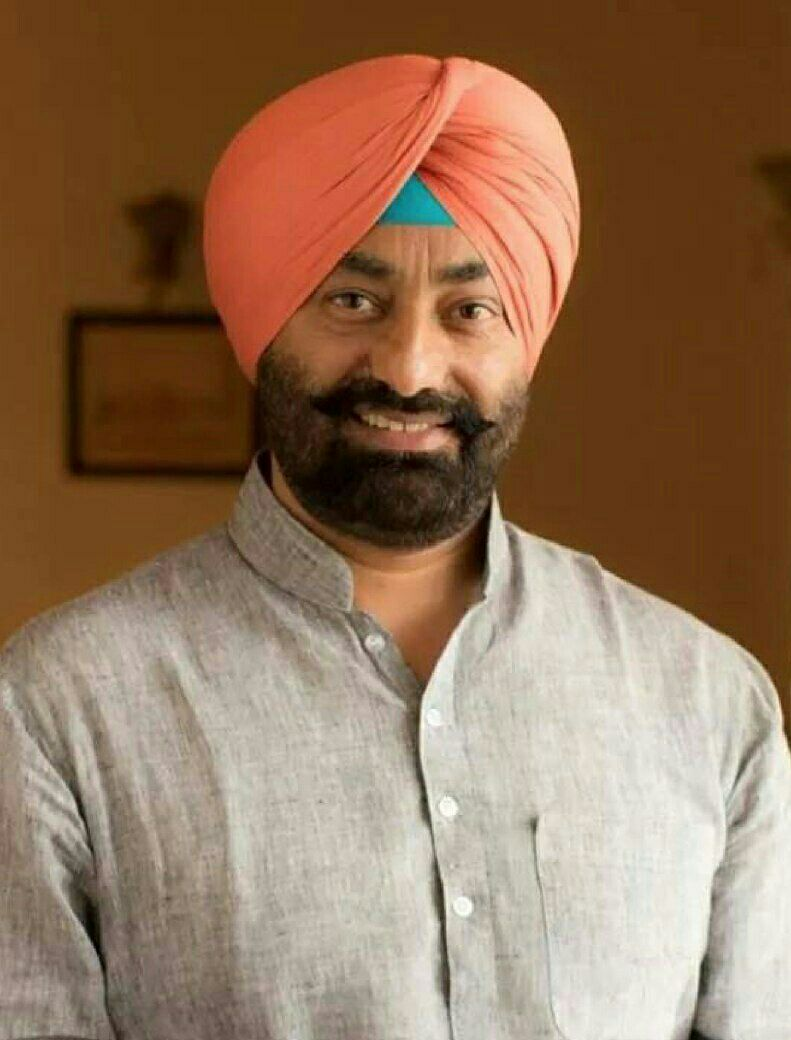
- Incumbent Sukhpal Singh Khaira
- Party: Indian National Congress
- Elected year: 2022

Bholath Assembly constituency (Sl. No.: 26) is a Punjab Legislative Assembly constituency of Bholath in Kapurthala district, Punjab state, India. Sukhpal Khaira won this seat on Aam Aadmi Party party ticket in 2017 Punjab Legislative Assembly election but later on created a new party Punjab Ekta Party in 2019, and later, in June 2021, he joined the Indian National Congress.

== Members of the Legislative Assembly ==
Most successful parties from Bholath Vidhan Sabha
1. SAD 6 times (63.6%)
2. INC (3 Times) (27.3%)
3. AAP (1 Time) (9.09%)

Year	Member	Party
As part of PEPSU Legislative Assembly (1954-56)
1954	Harnam Singh	Shiromani Akali Dal
Constituency defunct (1956-1977)
As part of Punjab Legislative Assembly (1977–Present)
1977	Sukhjinder Singh Khaira	Shiromani Akali Dal
1980	Sukhjinder Singh Khaira	Shiromani Akali Dal
1985	Sukhjinder Singh Khaira	Shiromani Akali Dal
1992	Jagtar Singh	Indian National Congress
1997	Bibi Jagir Kaur	Shiromani Akali Dal
2002	Bibi Jagir Kaur	Shiromani Akali Dal
2007	Sukhpal Singh Khaira	Indian National Congress
2012	Bibi Jagir Kaur	Shiromani Akali Dal
2017	Sukhpal Singh Khaira	Aam Aadmi Party
2022	Sukhpal Singh Khaira	Indian National Congress

== Election results ==
=== 2027 ===
Punjab Assembly election, 2027: Bholath
Party	Candidate	Votes	%	±%
AAP				
AD (WPD)				New entry
INC				
BSP				
SAD				
BJP				New entry
NOTA	None of the above			
Majority				
Turnout				

=== 2022 ===
Punjab Assembly election, 2022: Bholath
Party	Candidate	Votes	%	±%
INC	Sukhpal Singh Khaira	37,254	41.15	▲35.1
SAD	Bibi Jagir Kaur	28,029	31.20	▼10.33
AAP	Ranjit Singh Rana	13,612	15.20	▼34.7
PLC	Amandeep Singh Gora Gill	1,195	1.33	New
SAD(A)	Rajinder Singh Fauji	7,583	8.38	New
NOTA	None of the above	720	0.5	
Majority		9,225	10.19	
Turnout		90,537	66.10	
Registered electors		136,413		

=== 2017 ===
Punjab Assembly election, 2017: Bholath
Party	Candidate	Votes	%	±%
AAP	Sukhpal Singh Khaira	48,873	49.9	
SAD	Yuvraj Bhupinder Singh	40,671	41.53	
INC	Ranjit Singh Rana	5,923	6.05	
NOTA	None of the above	379	0.39	
Majority		8,202	8.4	
Turnout		97,561	74.9	
Registered electors		130,808		

=== Previous results ===
Year	A C No.	Winner	Party	Votes	Runner Up	Party	Votes
2012	26	Bibi Jagir Kaur	SAD	49,392	Sukhpal Singh Khaira	INC	42,387
2007	39	Sukhpal Singh Khaira	INC	48,072	Bibi Jagir Kaur	SAD	39,208
2002	40	Bibi Jagir Kaur	SAD	41,937	Sukhpal Singh Khaira	INC	30,559
1997	40	Bibi Jagir Kaur	SAD	53,168	Sukhpal Singh Khaira	INC	25,141
1992	40	Jagtar Singh	INC	2,865	Roop Singh	BSP	649
1985	40	Sukhjinder Singh Khaira	SAD	29,693	Jagtar Singh	INC	21,047
1980	40	Sukhjinder Singh Khaira	SAD	26,686	Naranjan Singh	INC (I)	21,902
1977	40	Sukhjinder Singh Khaira	SAD	29,390	Bawa Harnam Singh	IND	16,244
