= Sukhpal Singh Khaira =

Indian politician (born 1965)

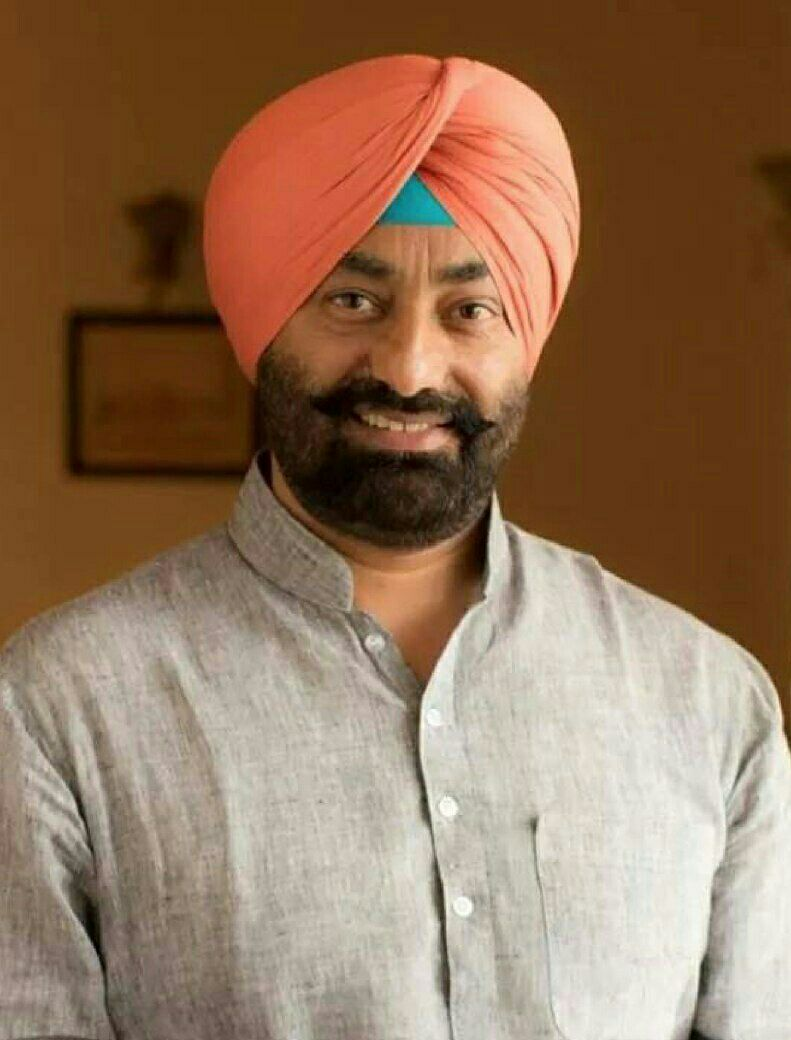

Leader of the Opposition Punjab Legislative Assembly
- In office 20 July 2017 – 26 July 2018
- Preceded by: H. S. Phoolka
- Succeeded by: Harpal Singh Cheema
- Constituency: Bholath, Kapurthala district

Member of the Punjab Legislative Assembly for Bholath
- Incumbent
- Assumed office 10 March 2022
- Preceded by: Himself
- In office 24 March 2017 – 3 June 2021
- Preceded by: Bibi Jagir Kaur
- In office 1 March 2007 – 6 March 2012
- Preceded by: Bibi Jagir Kaur
- Succeeded by: Vacant

Personal details
- Born: 13 January 1965 (age 61) Kapurthala, Punjab, India
- Party: INC (Until 2015; 2021-)
- Other political affiliations: PEP (2019-21); AAP (2015-18)

Sukhpal Singh Khaira (born 13 January 1965) is an Indian politician serving a third term as Indian National Congress MLA from Bholath constituency. He was the leader of opposition in Punjab Legislative Assembly during July 2017 to July 2018. He is the chairman of All India Kisan Congress since July 2022.

He started his political career with Youth Congress. In 1997, He became the vice-president of Punjab Youth Congress. He got political legacy from his father Sukhjinder Singh Khaira, a stalwart Shiromani Akali Dal leader. He is the national chairman of Kisan and Khet Mazdoor Congress.

== Personal life ==
Khaira was born on 13 January 1965. His native village is Ramgarh in the Bholath assembly segment. He is the son of Sukhjinder Singh Khaira, a veteran Shiromani Akali Dal leader and former Punjab education minister, who died in July 2010. He was educated at Bishop Cotton School, Shimla.

Khaira lives in Sector 5, Chandigarh. His son, Mehtab Singh Khaira, is an advocate.

== Political career ==
=== Early career ===
Khaira began his political career in 1994, when he was elected a member of the gram panchayat of his native village, Ramgarh, in Kapurthala district. He joined the Youth Congress and was appointed vice-president of the Punjab Youth Congress in 1997. In 1999 the Punjab Pradesh Congress Committee appointed him its secretary, and from 2005 to 2010 he was president of the Kapurthala District Congress Committee. In 2006 he was elected a director of the Kapurthala Central Cooperative Bank.

=== Indian National Congress (2007–2015) ===
After unsuccessful attempts in 1997 and 2002, Khaira was elected to the Punjab Legislative Assembly from Bholath as a Congress candidate in 2007, and served until 2012. He was appointed a spokesperson of the Punjab Congress in 2009 and reappointed in 2013. In May 2014 he resigned the post, taking moral responsibility for the party's poor performance in Punjab in the 2014 Lok Sabha election. In December 2015 he left the Congress and joined the Aam Aadmi Party (AAP).

=== Aam Aadmi Party and Leader of the Opposition (2015–2019) ===
Khaira won Bholath for AAP in the 2017 Punjab Legislative Assembly election. On 20 July 2017 he was named Leader of the Opposition in the Punjab Legislative Assembly. AAP removed him from the post in July 2018 after disagreements with the party leadership, and suspended him from the party in November 2018 for "anti-party activities". In December 2018 he announced the Punjab Democratic Alliance with the Bahujan Samaj Party, the Bains brothers and Dharamvir Gandhi. He resigned from AAP on 6 January 2019, saying the party had deviated from its founding ideology, and two days later launched the Punjab Ekta Party.

=== Punjab Ekta Party (2019–2021) ===
Khaira contested the 2019 Lok Sabha election from Bathinda as the Punjab Democratic Alliance candidate, finishing fourth with 25,377 votes; the seat was won by Harsimrat Kaur Badal. He submitted his resignation as an MLA in April 2019, but withdrew it in October 2019, saying he would instead contest AAP's attempt to have him disqualified.

=== Return to Congress (2021–present) ===
On 3 June 2021 Khaira rejoined the Congress along with two other rebel AAP MLAs, and on 17 June the Punjab Ekta Party formally merged with the Congress. His resignation from the assembly was accepted in October 2021, ending AAP's disqualification proceedings against him.

In the 2022 Punjab Legislative Assembly election he won Bholath for a third time as the Congress candidate, defeating Bibi Jagir Kaur of the Shiromani Akali Dal. In July 2022 he was appointed chairman of the All India Kisan Congress. In the 2024 Lok Sabha election he contested Sangrur and lost to Gurmeet Singh Meet Hayer of AAP by 172,560 votes.

==== Assets and liabilities declared during 2022 Punjab Legislative Assembly election ====
During the 2022 Punjab Legislative Assembly election, he declared ₹50,32,93,187 as an overall financial asset and ₹2,87,27,277 as financial liability.

== Controversies ==
Khaira admitted to meeting Arvind Kejriwal in early 2015. According to media the meeting was in pretext to join AAP Punjab, but prominent leaders of AAP Punjab blocked the entry of Khaira into the Party. In 2018, he was removed as the Leader of Opposition of the Punjab assembly, because of his problems with the party.

=== Legal and corruption-related allegations ===
==== Relations with drug smugglers ====
Allegations were made on Khaira that he was trying to protect trans-border Heroin smuggler Gurdev Singh, he rubbished the allegations and invited the enquiry. However, in April 2018, Justice Mehtab Singh Gill Panel, constituted by Govt., declared that all 17 cases against Sukhpal Singh Khaira were falsely registered and demanded action against police officers.

==== Money laundering and ED arrest (2021) ====
Khaira was arrested by the Enforcement Directorate (ED) in November 2021 in connection with a money laundering case under the Prevention of Money Laundering Act (PMLA). The case stemmed from a larger 2015 drug smuggling investigation involving heroin, gold, arms, and fake passports. The ED alleged Khaira had links with suspects in that case. A Mohali court later formally framed PMLA charges against him.

While granted bail by the High Court in early Jan 2024, he was immediately re-arrested within hours in a fresh case of criminal intimidation and witness tampering related to the same NDPS matter.

==== Allegations of accepting cash from party workers ====
In 2018, internal party criticism surfaced when Punjab Congress president Sunil Jakhar demanded Khaira's resignation as Leader of the Opposition amid allegations of financial impropriety, specifically, claims by AAP colleagues that Khaira accepted cash from party workers.
