= Kisan and Khet Mazdoor Congress =

Indian political organisation

- Formation: 14 December 1910; 115 years ago
- Founder: Hafiz Syed Abdul Aziz
- Founded at: New Delhi
- Type: Trade union
- Legal status: Active
- Headquarters: New Delhi
- Region served: India
- Chairman: Sukhpal Singh Khaira

Kisan and Khet Mazdoor Congress (abbreviated as KKMC) is a trade union of agricultural labourers in India. KKMC is the peasants' wing of Indian National Congress. Sukhpal Singh Khaira, a three-time MLA and former Leader of Opposition in Punjab Legislative Assembly, is the Chairman of KKMC since 2022.

Under the leadership of Sukhpal Singh Khaira, Kisan Congress stage protest at Jantar Mantar in Delhi for legal guarantee of MSP and other demands of farmers on 9 December 2022.

== List of presidents ==
S.no	President	Portrait	Term			Home state
1.	Shamsher Singh Surjewala		7 January 2006	2014	8 years	Haryana
Vacant (4 years)
2.	Nana Patole		18 September 2018	2 December 2019	1 year, 75 days	Maharashtra
Vacant (2 years, 222 days)
3.	Sukhpal Singh Khaira		14 July 2022	Incumbent	4 years, 60 days	Punjab
