= Mizoram Secular Alliance =

- Abbreviation: MSA
- President: Lalsawta
- Chairman: C. Ngunlianchunga
- Founded: 17 June 2004; August 2023 (revival attempt)
- Headquarters: Mizoram
- Seats in Rajya Sabha: 0 / 1
- Seats in Lok Sabha: 0 / 1
- Seats in Mizoram Legislative Assembly: 1 / 40

Mizoram Secular Alliance (MSA), formerly known as Mizoram Secular Force (MSF) was a political alliance in Mizoram. It was launched ahead of the 2004 Lok Sabha elections. MSA comprised Indian National Congress, Mizoram People's Conference and Zoram Nationalist Party.

In the 2004 elections, MSF had a joint candidate for the sole Mizoram (Lok Sabha constituency), Laltluangliana Khiangte. Khiangte lost the seat with 159,170 votes (45.67% of the votes in the state). Khiangte won in 9 out of 40 assembly constituencies making up the Lok Sabha constituency.

In August 2023, the Mizoram PCC leadership tried to launch the Mizoram Secular Alliance as a broad anti-BJP front, hoping to bring together all the major regional opposition forces in the state. However, the state's largest opposition political party refused to join the coalition. The front was ultimately left with just two minor regional groups including Zoram Nationalist Party (ZNP) and the Mizoram People's Conference (MPC). Neither party ended up fielding any candidates for the election, choosing instead to simply offer outside campaign support to Congress nominees. Furthermore, the MPC had already lost its official state party status before the election, when the Election Commission of India downgraded it to a Registered Unrecognized Political Party. Once the 2023 election cycle wrapped up, the alliance fell completely inactive, and the individual parties went back to running their own independent operations.

== Members ==
| No. | Party | Flag | Symbol | Leader | Photo |
|---|---|---|---|---|---|
| 1. | Indian National Congress | | | Zodintluanga Ralte | |
| 2 | Zoram Nationalist Party | | | H. Lalrinmawia | |
| 3 | Mizoram Peoples Conference | | | Vanlalruata | |
