= Indian National Congress =

Political party in India (founded 1885)

- Abbreviation: INC
- President: Mallikarjun Kharge
- General Secretary: Bhupesh Baghel; Deepa Dasmunsi; Ghulam Ahmad Mir; Jairam Ramesh; K. C. Venugopal; Kumari Selja; Mukul Wasnik; Priyanka Gandhi; Randeep Singh Surjewala; Sachin Pilot; Syed Naseer Hussain
- Presidium: All India Congress Committee
- Parliamentary Chairperson: Sonia Gandhi
- Rajya Sabha Leader: Mallikarjun Kharge (LoP in Rajya Sabha)
- Lok Sabha Leader: Rahul Gandhi (LoP in Lok Sabha)
- Treasurer: Ajay Maken
- Founder: Allan Octavian Hume; Womesh Chunder Bonnerjee; Surendranath Banerjee; Monomohun Ghose; William Wedderburn; Dadabhai Naoroji; Badruddin Tyabji; Pherozeshah Mehta; Dinshaw Edulji Wacha; Mahadev Govind Ranade
- Founded: 28 December 1885 (140 years, 328 days ago)
- Headquarters: Indira Bhawan, 9-A, Kotla Marg, New Delhi-110001
- Newspaper: Congress Sandesh; National Herald
- Student wing: National Students' Union of India
- Youth wing: Indian Youth Congress
- Women's wing: All India Mahila Congress
- Labour wing: Indian National Trade Union Congress
- Peasant's wing: Kisan and Khet Mazdoor Congress
- Membership: 26 million (2022)
- Ideology: Liberalism (Indian); Social democracy; Secularism (Indian); Civic nationalism; Big tent
- Political position: Centre
- International affiliation: Progressive Alliance; Socialist International
- Colours: Saffron, white, and green (official; Indian national colours); Sky blue (customary)
- ECI status: National Party
- Alliance: National alliance; INDIA (since 2023); State alliances; UDF (Kerala); MPSA (Manipur); MVA (Maharashtra); MGB (Jharkhand); SSJVA (Tamil Nadu); SP+ (Uttar Pradesh); MGB (Bihar); SDF (Tripura); ASM (Assam); Former: National alliance; UPA (2004–2023 (till dissolved)); State alliances; DMK-led Alliance (1971–1974, 1980–1983, 2004–2013, 2016–2026) (Tamil Nadu); AIADMK-led Alliance (1977, 1984–1996, 1999–2001) (Tamil Nadu); Democratic Front (1999–2019 (till dissolved)) (Maharashtra); Secular Progressive Alliance (2016–2026) (Tamil Nadu and Puducherry); MSA (2004 (till dissolved)) (Mizoram); Secular Progressive Front (2002–2012 (till dissolved)) (Manipur)
- Seats in Rajya Sabha: 30 / 245
- Seats in Lok Sabha: 98 / 543; (540 MPs and 3 vacant)
- Seats in State Legislative Councils: 56 / 426; (409 MLCs and 17 vacant); (see complete list)
- Seats in State Legislative Assemblies: 662 / 4,126; (4030 MLAs and 5 vacant); (see complete list)
- Number of states and union territories in government: 7 / 31; (28 States and 3 UTs)

Election symbol
- Raised Hand

Party flag

Website
- inc.in

The Indian National Congress (INC), also known as the Congress Party, or simply the Congress, is a political party in India with widespread roots. Founded on 28 December 1885, it was the first modern nationalist movement to emerge in the non-European British Empire. (Note: "The first modern nationalist movement to arise in the non-European empire, and one that became an inspiration for many others, was the Indian Congress.") From the late 19th century, and especially after 1920, under the leadership of Mahatma Gandhi, the Congress became the principal leader of the Indian independence movement. The Congress led India to independence from the United Kingdom, (Note: "South Asian parties include several of the oldest in the post-colonial world, foremost among them the 129-year-old Indian National Congress that led India to independence in 1947") (Note: "The organization that led India to independence, the Indian National Congress, was established in 1885.") and significantly influenced other anti-colonial nationalist movements in the British Empire. (Note: "... anti-colonial movements ... which, like many other nationalist movements elsewhere in the empire, were strongly influenced by the Indian National Congress.")

The INC is a "big tent" party that has been described as sitting in the centre of the Indian political spectrum. The party held its first session in 1885 in Bombay where W.C. Bonnerjee presided over it. After Indian independence in 1947, Congress emerged as a catch-all, Indian nationalist and secular party, dominating Indian politics for the next 50 years. The party's first prime minister, Jawaharlal Nehru, led the Congress to support socialist policies by creating the Planning Commission, introducing Five-Year Plans, implementing a mixed economy, and establishing a secular state. After Nehru's death and the short tenure of Lal Bahadur Shastri, Indira Gandhi became the leader of the party. In the 17 general elections since independence, it has won an outright majority on seven occasions and has led the ruling coalition a further three times, heading the central government for more than 54 years. There have been six prime ministers from the Congress party, the first being Jawaharlal Nehru (1947–1964), and the most recent being Manmohan Singh (2004–2014). Since the 1990s, the Bharatiya Janata Party has emerged as the main rival of the Congress in both national and regional politics.

In 1969, the party suffered a major split, with a faction led by Indira Gandhi leaving to form the Congress (R), with the remainder becoming the Congress (O). The Congress (R) became the dominant faction, winning the 1971 general election by a huge margin. From 1975 to 1977, Indira Gandhi declared a state of emergency in India, resulting in widespread oppression and abuses of power. Another split in the party occurred in 1979, leading to the creation of the Congress (I), which was recognised as the Congress by the Election Commission in 1981. Under Rajiv Gandhi's leadership, the party won a massive victory in the 1984 general elections, nevertheless losing the election held in 1989 to the National Front. The Congress then returned to power under P. V. Narasimha Rao, who moved the party towards an economically liberal agenda, a sharp break from previous leaders. However, it lost the 1996 general election and was replaced in government by the National Front. After a record eight years out of office, the Congress-led coalition known as the United Progressive Alliance (UPA) under Manmohan Singh formed a government after the 2004 general elections. Subsequently, the UPA again formed the government after winning the 2009 general elections, and Singh became the first prime minister since Indira Gandhi in 1971 to be re-elected after completing a full five-year term. However, under the leadership of Rahul Gandhi in the 2014 general election, the Congress suffered a heavy defeat, winning only 44 seats of the 543-member Lok Sabha (the lower house of the Parliament of India). In the 2019 general election, the party failed to make any substantial gains and won 52 seats, failing to form the official opposition yet again. In the 2024 general election, the party performed better-than-expected, and won 99 seats, forming the official opposition with their highest seat count in a decade.

On social issues, it advocates secular policies that encourage equal opportunity, right to health, right to education, civil liberty, and support social market economy, and a strong welfare state. Being a centrist party, its policies predominantly reflected balanced positions including secularism, egalitarianism, and social stratification. The INC supports contemporary economic reforms such as liberalisation, privatisation and globalisation. A total of 61 people have served as the president of the INC since its formation. Sonia Gandhi is the longest-serving president of the party, having held office for over twenty years from 1998 to 2017 and again from 2019 to 2022 (as interim). Mallikarjun Kharge is the current party president. The district party is the smallest functional unit of Congress. There is also a Pradesh Congress Committee (PCC), present at the state level in every state. Together, the delegates from the districts and PCCs form the All India Congress Committee (AICC). The party is additionally structured into various committees and segments including the Working Committee (CWC), Seva Dal, Indian Youth Congress (IYC), Indian National Trade Union Congress (INTUC), and National Students' Union of India (NSUI). The party holds the annual plenary sessions, at which senior Congress figures promote party policy.

== History ==
=== Foundation ===
During the latter part of the 1870s, there were concerted efforts among Indians to establish a pan-Indian organisation for nationalist political influence. In 1883, Allan Octavian Hume, a retired British Civil Servant also known for his pro-Indian activities, outlined his idea for a body representing Indian interests in an open letter to graduates of the University of Calcutta. The aim was to obtain a greater share in government for educated Indians and to create a platform for civic and political dialogue between them and the British Raj. Hume initiated contact with prominent leaders in India and a notice convening the first meeting of the Indian National Union to be held in Poona the following December, was issued. However, due to a cholera outbreak in Poona it was moved to Bombay. Subsequently, the first session of the Indian National Congress held in Bombay from 28 to 31 December 1885 at Gokuldas Tejpal Sanskrit College. Hume organised the first meeting in Bombay with the approval of the Viceroy Lord Dufferin. He assumed office as the General Secretary, while Umesh Chandra Banerjee was appointed as the first president of Congress. Hume believed that while the British helped bring peace to India, they still had not solved the country's economic problems.

First session of Indian National Congress, Bombay, 28–31 December 1885

The first session was attended by 72 delegates, with the majority being lawyers, representing each province of India. Notable representatives included Scottish ICS officer William Wedderburn, Dadabhai Naoroji, Badruddin Tyabji and Pherozeshah Mehta of the Bombay Presidency Association, Ganesh Vasudeo Joshi of the Poona Sarvajanik Sabha, social reformer and newspaper editor Gopal Ganesh Agarkar, Justice K. T. Telang, N. G. Chandavarkar, Dinshaw Wacha, Behramji Malabari, journalist, and activist Gooty Kesava Pillai, and P. Rangaiah Naidu of the Madras Mahajana Sabha. Notably, there were no women present at this session. During the first session, the Indian delegates presented 9 resolutions to the British authorities including; India Council in London should be abolished, creation of legislative councils for the North-West Frontier Province (NWFP), Sindh and Awadh, Civil Services Reform, and Appointment of a commission to enquire into the working of the Indian Administration from 1858- till date. Dadabhai Naoroji, a member of the sister Indian National Association, was elected president of the Congress in 1886. He was the first Indian Member of Parliament in the British House of Commons (1892–1895) and spent a large part of his life and resources campaigning for India's cause on the international stage. In 1889, a British branch of the Indian National Congress was set up in London.

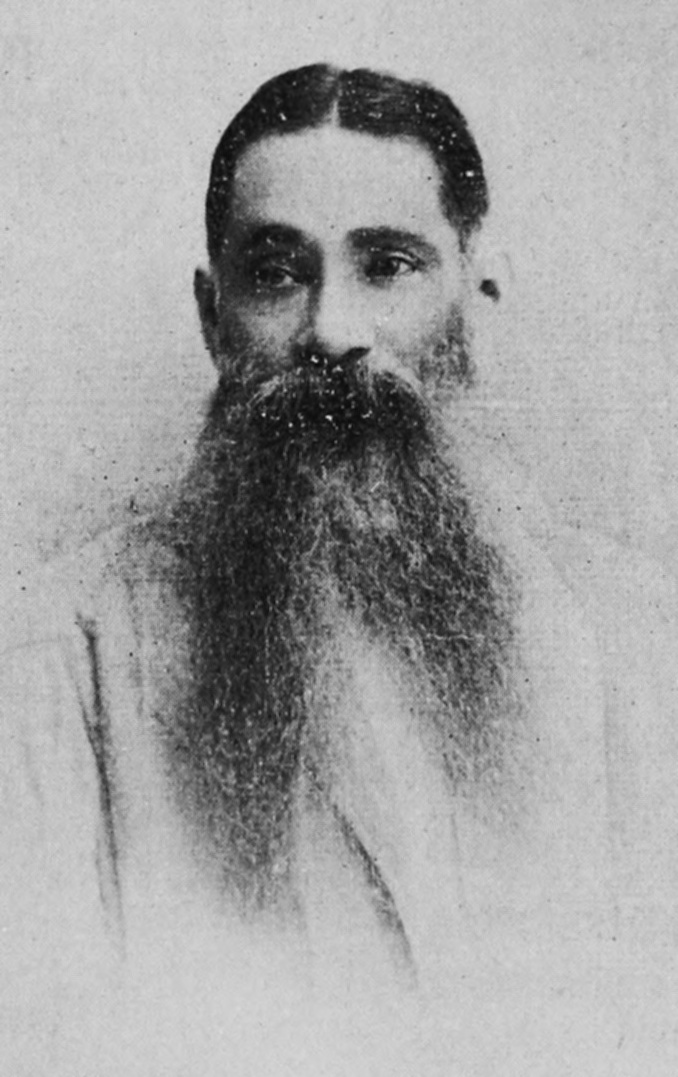
Womesh Chunder Bonnerjee, first president of Indian National Congress

In its initial years, the Congress served as a platform for politically active individuals advocating reforms within the British Empire. However, two distinct factions emerged: one group sought complete independence from British rule, while the other aimed for reforms within the existing system, with a focus on Indianisation. This division marked the early phase of Congress, as different leaders and members had varied visions for the future of India, ranging from moderate reforms to a push for full sovereignty. They primarily advocated for the 'Indianisation' of administrative services, emphasising that India should be governed by Indians, in collaboration with the British. The majority of the founding members of Congress has been educated or lived in Britain. As a result, unrepresentative of the Indian masses at the time, it functioned more as a stage for elite Indian ambitions than a political party for the first two decade of its existence.

=== Early years ===
Since its establishment, the Congress was led by Moderate leaders, who were influenced by Western political ideas, particularly liberalism. They emphasised individual dignity, right to freedom and equality for all, regardless of caste, creed, or sex. This philosophy guided them in opposing British autocracy, demanding the rule of law, equality before the law, and advocating for secularism. However, by 1905, the party had divided into two groups, each with its own approach and ideology on how to attain self-governance for India. A division arose between the Moderates—led by Dadabhai Naoroji, Romesh Chunder Dutt, Gopal Krishna Gokhale, and Dinshaw Wacha—who believed in a peaceful and constitutional approach to achieving reforms and self-governance within the framework of the British Empire, and the Extremists, led by Lala Lajpat Rai, Bipin Chandra Pal and Bal Gangadhar Tilak—who favored a more assertive and confrontational strategy.

The moderates preferred to avoid direct conflict with the British, aiming instead to reform their governance to better serve the country's interests. They aimed to collaborate with British authorities and use constitutional means, such as petitions, resolutions, and dialogue, to address the grievances of Indians. Over time, as they recognised the impact of British rule, many moderate leaders shifted their stance and started advocating for Swaraj or self-government for India within the British Empire. Thereafter, the moderates followed a two-fold approach to achieve their goals. First, they aimed to build strong public opinion to inspire a sense of national consciousness and unity, while educating the masses on shared political issues. Second, they sought to influence both the British government and public opinion, advocating for reforms in India that aligned with the demands of the nationalists. The Moderates were able to analyse the political and economic impacts of British rule in India. Dadabhai Naoroji, Romesh Chunder Dutt and Dinshaw Wacha and others introduced the Drain Theory to highlight how Britain exploited India's resources. The Drain Theory, proposed by these leaders, challenged the notion that British rule was beneficial for India, shaping a nationwide public opinion that British colonialism was the primary reason for India's poverty and economic exploitation. The moderate leaders had several demands, including proper representation of Indians on the Legislative Councils and an increase in the powers of these councils. They also advocated for administrative reforms and voiced their opinions on international issues. They opposed annexation of Burma, military actions in Afghanistan and the treatment of tribal people in northwestern India. Additionally, they called for better conditions for Indian workers who had migrated to countries such as South Africa, Malaya, Mauritius, West Indies and British Guiana as indentured labourers.

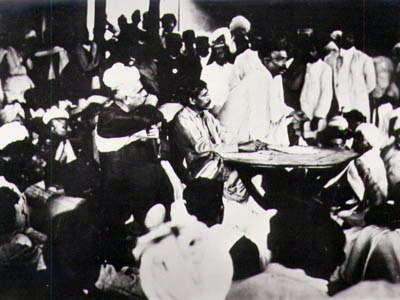
Bal Gangadhar Tilak speaking in 1907 as the Party split into moderates and extremists. Seated at the table is Aurobindo Ghosh and to his right (in the chair) is G. S. Khaparde, both allies of Tilak.

The other faction, led by radical leaders such as Lala Lajpat Rai, Bal Gangadhar Tilak and Bipin Chandra Pal—colloquially known as "Lal, Bal, Pal"—advocated a more militant approach. Known as the extremist group, or assertive nationalists, they emerged prominently after the partition of Bengal in 1905. They believed in direct action and criticised the moderate approach, advocating for more aggressive means to achieve self-rule (Swaraj). Disillusioned by the limited achievements of the moderates, they were less willing to compromise with the British. Instead, they focused on building mass support by instilling a sense of self-respect, self-reliance, pride in their ancient heritage and national unity to attain their objectives. The Extremist leaders did not support the use of violence against British rule and rejected methods such as political murder and assassination. They successfully engaged the urban middle and lower classes, while also mobilising peasants and workers. Although they used religious symbols to inspire the masses, they consciously avoided mixing religion with politics. Tilak sought to mobilise Hindu Indians by appealing to an explicitly Hindu political identity displayed in the annual public Sarvajanik Ganeshotsav and Shiv Jayanti festivals that he inaugurated in western India, particularly in the Bombay Presidency. Tilak, along with his associates Gopal Ganesh Agarkar and Vishnushastri Chiplunkar, believed that educating the masses was the most effective way to serve the nation. In line with this belief, they co-founded the New English School in Pune in 1876 to provide modern, Indian-controlled education as an alternative to British institutions. Subsequently, these leaders established the Deccan Education Society (DES) to advance their pedagogical objectives, with a particular emphasis on cultivating national consciousness among Indian youth. However, Tilak soon realised that education alone was not sufficient; he believed it was equally important to raise public awareness about the country's condition. To achieve this, he started two weekly publications in 1881: the Maratha in English and Kesari in Marathi. By the end of 1905, Congress began transforming into a mass movement, largely due to the agitation against the partition of Bengal and the emergence of the Swadeshi movement. The Moderates’ approach of gradual reforms through constitutional methods and the Extremists’ advocacy of direct action were fundamentally incompatible. These ideological disagreements between the Extremists and the Moderates caused a deep rift within the movement. At the Congress session held in Surat in December 1907, the party formally split into two factions, an event later referred to as the Surat Split.

Annie Besant, a British social reformer, moved to India in 1893 and became actively involved in the Congress. Recognising the importance of full cooperation from the moderates for the success of the movement, both Tilak and Besant realised that it was necessary to secure the full cooperation of the moderates. In 1915, during the annual session of the Congress held at Lucknow under the presidency of Ambica Charan Mazumdar, it was decided that the extremists led by Tilak would be admitted to the Congress. Inspired by the Irish Home Rule movement, which sought greater autonomy from Britain, Tilak and Besant were influenced by the concept of self-government (Home Rule) and began calling for similar rights for India. However, Tilak and Besant were unable to convince the Indian National Congress to support their proposal to set up Home Rule leagues. As a result, they established separate leagues. Tilak launched the Indian Home Rule League in April 1916 at Belgaum, with its headquarters in Poona. His league operated primarily in Maharashtra (excluding Bombay), Karnataka and Central Provinces and Berar. In contrast, Besant set up her All-India Home Rule League in September 1916 in Madras, which grew to include over 200 branches across the country. Prominent leaders who joined or supported the Home Rule movement included Motilal Nehru, Muhammad Ali Jinnah, Bhulabhai Desai, Saifuddin Kitchlew, Jawaharlal Nehru, Chittaranjan Das, Kanaiyalal Maneklal Munshi, Madan Mohan Malviya, Tej Bahadur Sapru and Lala Lajpat Rai.

=== Congress as a mass movement ===
In 1915, Mahatma Gandhi returned from South Africa and joined Congress. His efforts in South Africa were well known not only among the educated but also among the masses. During 1917 and 1918, Mahatma Gandhi was involved in three struggles: known as Champaran Satyagraha, Ahmedabad Mill Strike and Kheda Satyagraha. After World War I, the party came to be associated with Gandhi, who remained its unofficial spiritual leader and icon. He formed an alliance with the Khilafat Movement in 1920 as part of his opposition to British rule in India, and fought for the rights for Indians using civil disobedience or Satyagraha as the tool for agitation. In 1922, after the deaths of policemen at Chauri Chaura, Gandhi suspended the agitation.

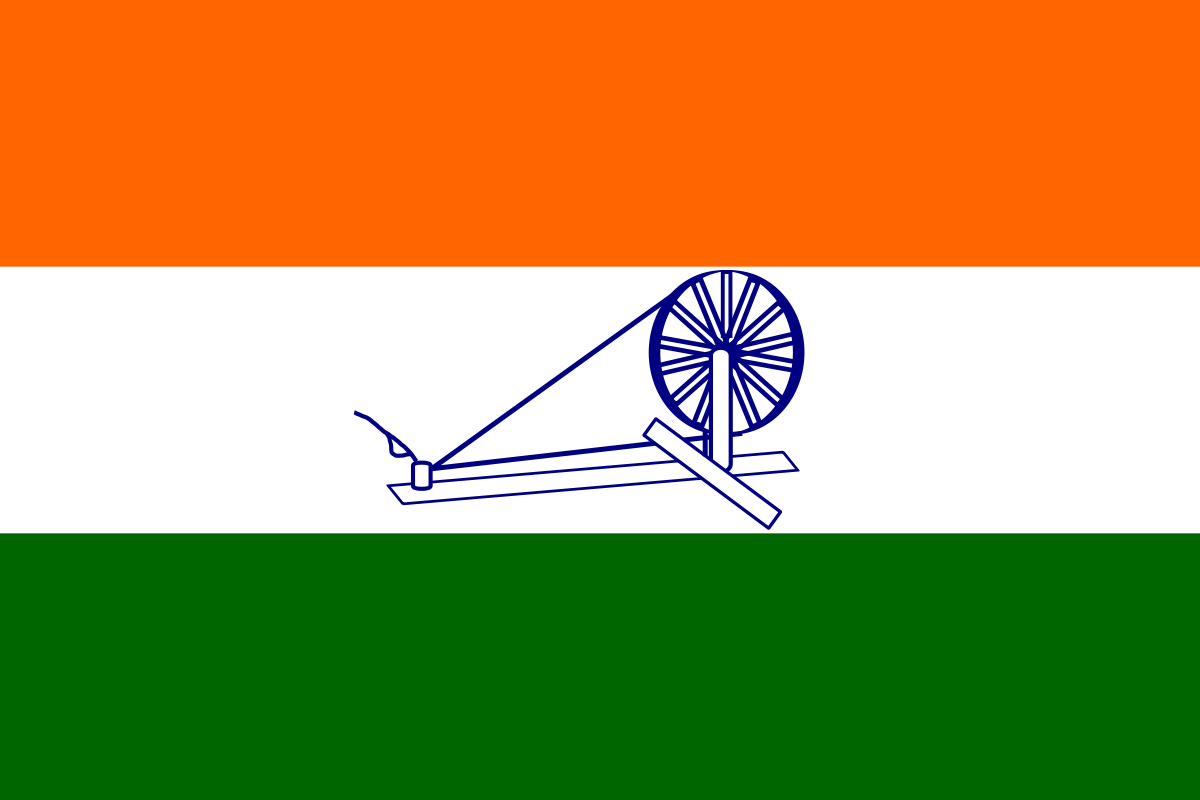
Flag adopted by INC, 1931

With the help of the moderate group led by Gokhale, in 1924 Gandhi became president of Congress. The rise of Gandhi's popularity and his satyagraha art of revolution led to support from Sardar Vallabhbhai Patel, Pandit Jawaharlal Nehru, Rajendra Prasad, Khan Mohammad Abbas Khan, Khan Abdul Ghaffar Khan, Chakravarti Rajgopalachari, Anugrah Narayan Sinha, Jayaprakash Narayan, Jivatram Kripalani and Maulana Abul Kalam Azad. As a result of prevailing nationalism, Gandhi's popularity, and the party's attempts at eradicating caste differences, untouchability, poverty, and religious and ethnic divisions, Congress became a forceful and dominant group. Although its members were predominantly Hindu, it had members from other religions, economic classes, and ethnic and linguistic groups.

At the Congress 1929 Lahore session under the presidency of Jawaharlal Nehru, Purna Swaraj (complete independence) was declared as the party's goal, declaring 26 January 1930 as Purna Swaraj Diwas (Independence Day). The same year, Srinivas Iyenger was expelled from the party for demanding full independence, not just home rule as demanded by Gandhi.

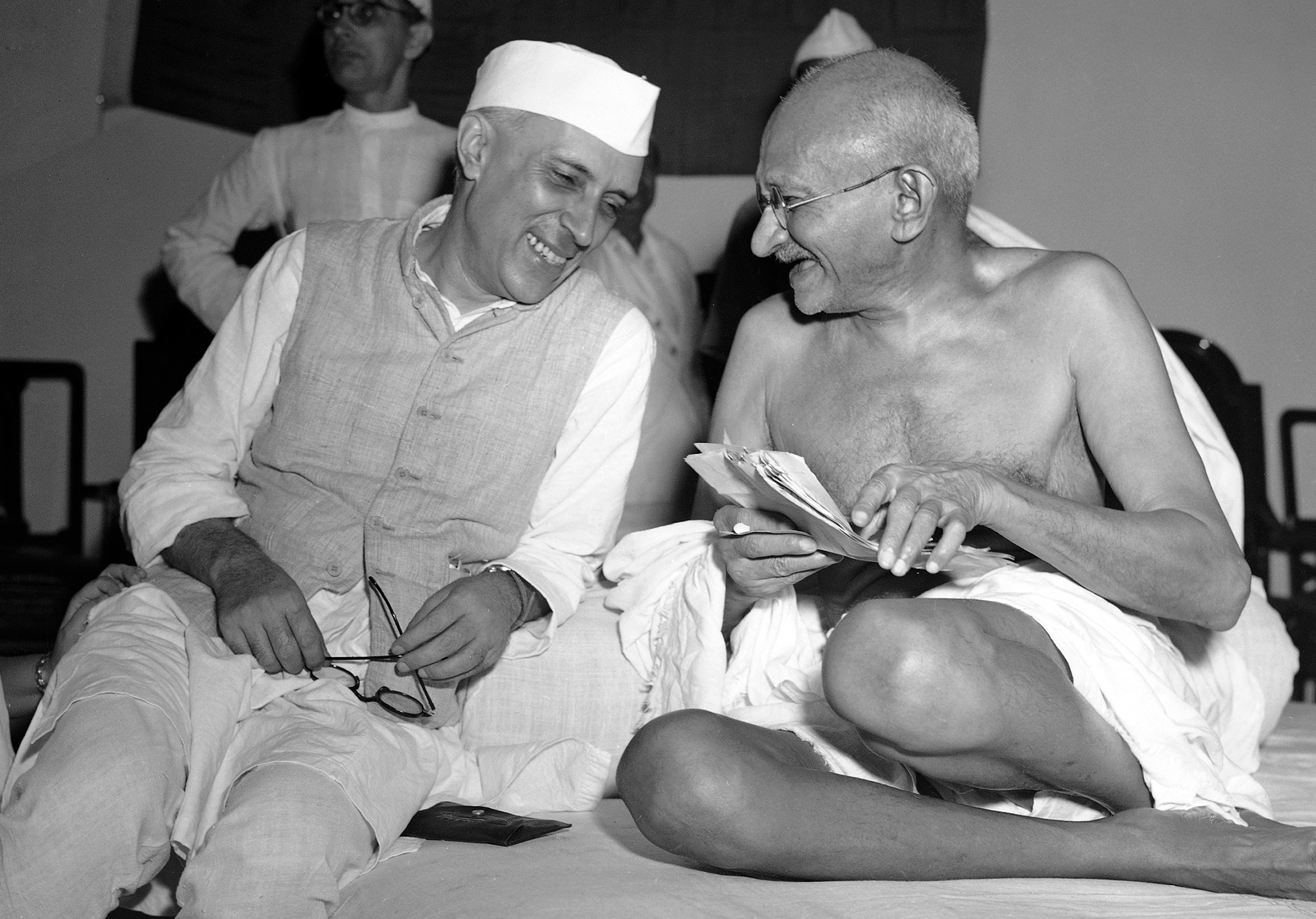
Gandhi and Nehru during a meeting of the All India Congress, 1946

After the passage of the Government of India Act 1935, provincial elections were held in India in the winter of 1936–37 in eleven provinces: Madras, Central Provinces, Bihar, Orissa, United Provinces, Bombay Presidency, Assam, North-West Frontier Province, Bengal, Punjab and Sindh. The final results of the elections were declared in February 1937. The Indian National Congress gained power in eight of them; the three exceptions being Bengal, Punjab and Sindh. The All-India Muslim League failed to form a Government in any Province.

Congress Ministers resigned in October and November 1939 in protest against Viceroy Lord Linlithgow's declaration that India was a belligerent in World War II without consulting the Indian people. In 1939, Subhas Chandra Bose, the elected president of Congress in 1938 and 1939, resigned from Congress over the selection of the working committee. Congress was an umbrella organisation, sheltering radical socialists, traditionalists, and Hindu and Muslim conservatives. Mahatma Gandhi expelled all the socialist groupings, including Congress Socialist Party, Krishak Praja Party and Swaraj Party, along with Subhas Chandra Bose, in 1939.

After the failure of the Cripps Mission launched by the British government to gain Indian support for the British war effort, Mahatma Gandhi made a call to "Do or Die", delivered in Bombay on 8 August 1942 at the Gowalia Tank Maidan. Gandhi endorsed the Quit India Movement, opposing any help to the British cause in Second World War. The colonial government instituted mass arrests including of Gandhi and Congress leaders, and killed over 1,000 Indians who participated in this movement. Meanwhile, a spate of violent attacks were carried out by the nationalists against the colonial government and infrastructure. The movement played a role in weakening British control over the South Asian region and ultimately paved the way for Indian independence.

In 1945, when the Second World War almost came to an end, the Labour Party of the United Kingdom won elections with a promise to provide independence to India. The jailed political prisoners of the Quit India movement were released in the same year.

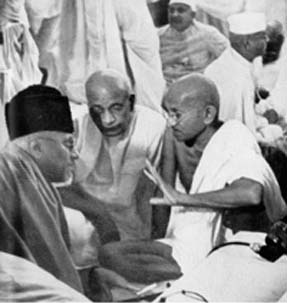
Azad, Patel and Gandhi at an AICC meeting in Bombay, 1940

In 1946, the colonial government tried the soldiers of Japanese-sponsored Indian National Army in the INA trials. In response, Congress helped form the INA Defence Committee, which assembled a legal team to defend the soldiers of the Azad Hind provisional government. The team included several famous lawyers, including Bhulabhai Desai, Asaf Ali and Jawaharlal Nehru. The colonial government eventually backtracked in the face of opposition by the Congress.

=== Post-independence ===
After Indian independence in 1947, the Indian National Congress became the dominant political party in the country. The long period of early dominance in the politics of the republic led to its political system sometimes being referred to as the "Congress System". In 1952, in the first general election held after Independence, the party swept to power in the national parliament and most state legislatures. It held power nationally until 1977 when it was defeated by the Janata coalition. It returned to power in 1980 and ruled until 1989 when it was once again defeated. The party formed the government in 1991 at the head of a coalition, as well as in 2004 and 2009 when it led the United Progressive Alliance. During this period the Congress remained centre-left in its social policies while steadily shifting from a socialist to a neoliberal economic outlook. The Party's rivals at state level have been national parties including Bharatiya Janata Party and Communist Party of India (Marxist) and various regional parties, such as the Bharat Rashtra Samithi, Shiv Sena and Aam Aadmi Party.

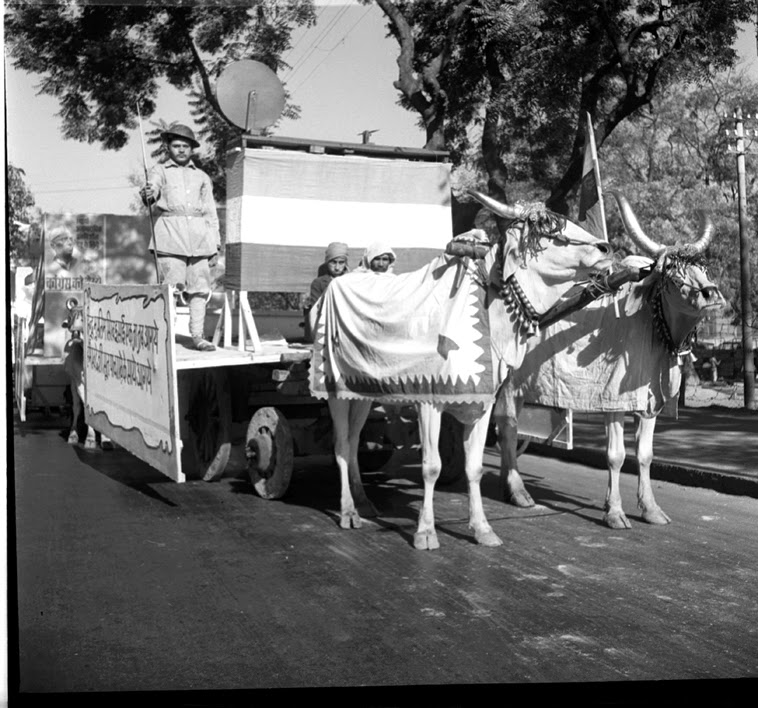
A Congress procession including bullocks and a flag – a pair of bullocks was the election symbol of the Congress Party, 1952

A post-partition successor to the party survived as the Pakistan National Congress, a party which represented the rights of religious minorities in the state. The party's support was strongest in the Bengali-speaking province of East Pakistan. After the Bangladeshi War of Independence, it became known as the Bangladeshi National Congress, but was dissolved in 1975 by the government.

==== Nehru and Shastri era (1947–1966) ====
From 1951 until his death in 1964, Jawaharlal Nehru was the paramount leader of the party. Congress gained power in landslide victories in the general elections of 1951–52, 1957 and 1962. During his tenure, Nehru implemented policies based on import substitution industrialisation, and advocated a mixed economy where the government-controlled public sector co-existed with the private sector. He believed the establishment of basic and heavy industries was fundamental to the development and modernisation of the Indian economy. The Nehru government directed investment primarily into key public sector industries—steel, iron, coal, and power—promoting their development with subsidies and protectionist policies. Nehru embraced secularism, socialistic economic practices based on state-driven industrialisation, and a non-aligned and non-confrontational foreign policy that became typical of the modern Congress Party. The policy of non-alignment during the Cold War meant Nehru received financial and technical support from both the Eastern and Western Blocs to build India's industrial base from nothing.

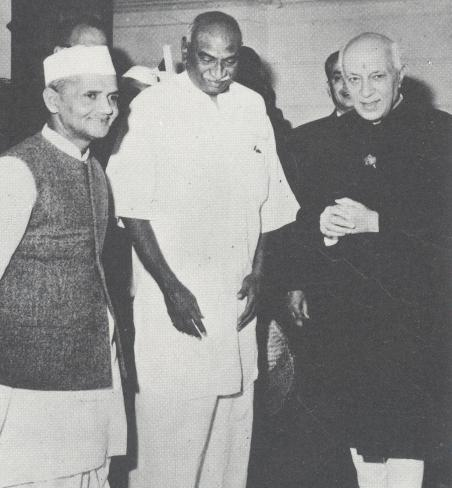
Shastri, Kamaraj and Nehru during an event, 1954

During his period in office, there were four known assassination attempts on Nehru. The first attempt on his life was during partition in 1947 while he was visiting the North-West Frontier Province in a car. The second was by a knife-wielding rickshaw-puller in Maharashtra in 1955. A third attempt happened in Bombay in 1956. The fourth was a failed bombing attempt on railway tracks in Maharashtra in 1961. Despite threats to his life, Nehru despised having excess security personnel around him and did not like his movements to disrupt traffic. K. Kamaraj became the president of the All India Congress Committee in 1963 during the last year of Nehru's life. Prior to that, he had been the chief minister of Madras state for nine years. Kamaraj had also been a member of "the syndicate", a group of right wing leaders within Congress. In 1963 the Congress lost popularity following the defeat in the Indo-Chinese war of 1962. To revitalise the party, Kamaraj proposed the Kamaraj Plan to Nehru that encouraged six Congress chief ministers (including himself) and six senior cabinet ministers to resign to take up party work.

In 1964, Nehru died because of an aortic dissection, raising questions about the party's future. Following the death of Nehru, Gulzarilal Nanda was appointed as the interim prime minister on 27 May 1964, pending the election of a new parliamentary leader of the Congress party who would then become prime minister. During the leadership contest to succeed Nehru, the preference was between Morarji Desai and Lal Bahadur Shashtri. Eventually, Shashtri was selected as the next parliamentary leader thus the Prime Minister. Kamaraj was widely credited as the "kingmaker" in for ensuring the victory of Lal Bahadur Shastri over Morarji Desai.

As prime minister, Shastri retained most of members of Nehru's Council of Ministers; T. T. Krishnamachari was retained as Finance Minister of India, as was Defence Minister Yashwantrao Chavan. Shastri appointed Swaran Singh to succeed him as External Affairs Minister. Shastri appointed Indira Gandhi, Jawaharlal Nehru's daughter and former party president, Minister of Information and Broadcasting. Gulzarilal Nanda continued as the Minister of Home Affairs. As Prime Minister, Shastri continued Nehru's policy of non-alignment, but built closer relations with the Soviet Union. In the aftermath of the Sino-Indian War of 1962, and the formation of military ties between China and Pakistan, Shastri's government expanded the defence budget of India's armed forces. He also promoted the White Revolution—a national campaign to increase the production and supply of milk by creating the National Dairy Development Board. The Madras anti-Hindi agitation of 1965 occurred during Shastri's tenure.

Shastri became a national hero following victory in the Indo-Pakistani War of 1965. His slogan, "Jai Jawan Jai Kisan" ("Hail the soldier, Hail the farmer"), became very popular during the war. On 11 January 1966, a day after signing the Tashkent Declaration, Shastri died in Tashkent, reportedly of a heart attack; but the circumstances of his death remain mysterious. After Shastri's death, Congress elected Indira Gandhi as leader over Morarji Desai. Once again, K. Kamaraj was instrumental in achieving this result. The differences among the top leadership of the Congress regarding the future of the party during resulted in the formation of several breakaway parties such as Orissa Jana Congress, Bangla Congress, Utkal Congress and Bharatiya Kranti Dal.

==== Indira Gandhi era (1966–1984) ====
In 1967, following a poor performance in the 1967 Indian general election, Indira Gandhi started moving toward the political left. On 12 July 1969, Congress Parliamentary Board nominated Neelam Sanjiva Reddy as Congress's candidate for the post of President of India by a vote of four to two. K. Kamaraj, Morarji Desai and S. K. Patil voted for Reddy. Indira Gandhi and Fakhruddin Ali Ahmed voted for V. V. Giri and Congress President S. Nijalingappa, Home Minister Yashwantrao Chavan and Agriculture Minister Jagjivan Ram abstained from voting.

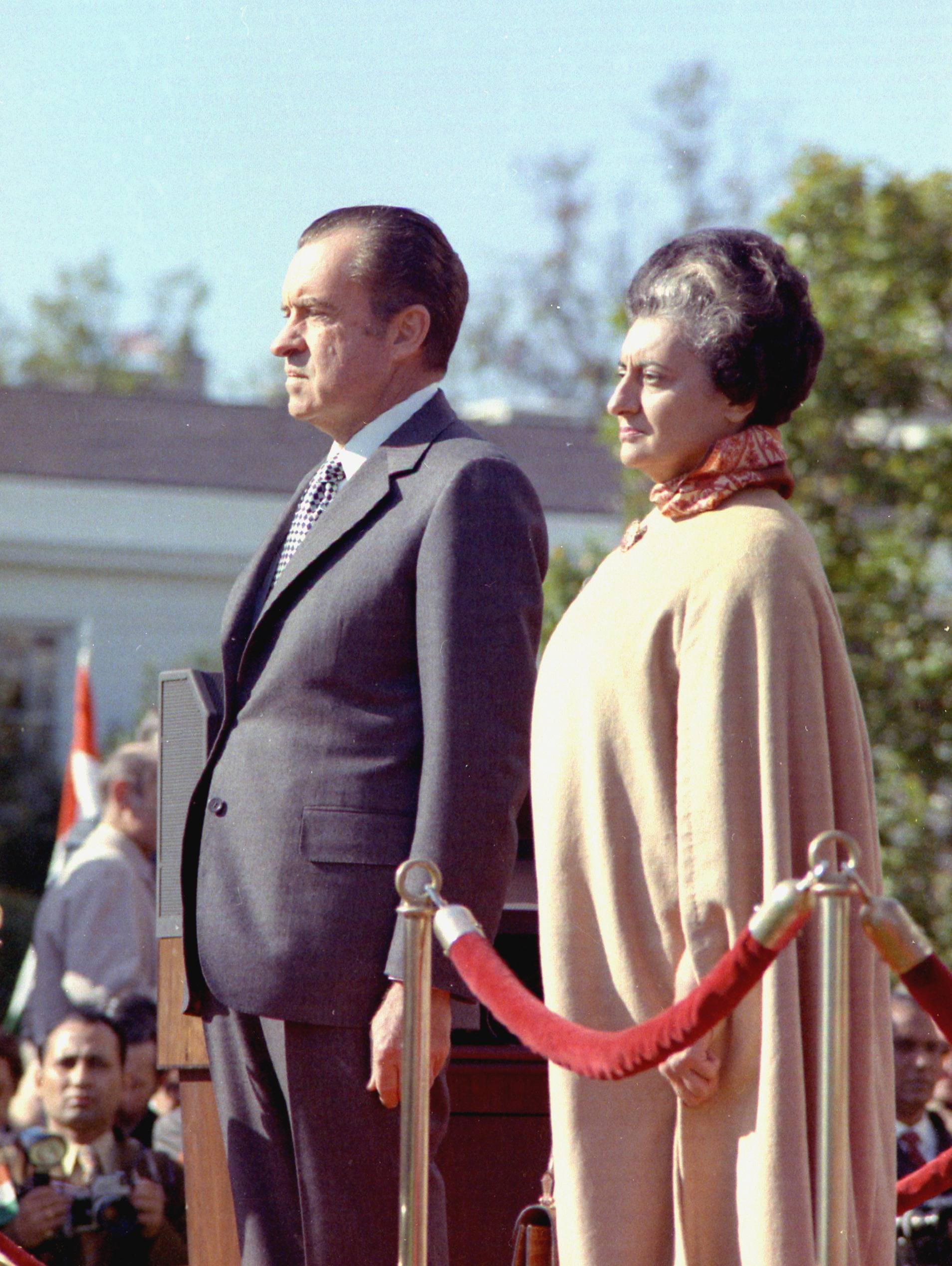
Indira Gandhi with U.S. President Richard Nixon, 1971

In mid-1969, she was involved in a dispute with senior party leaders on several issues. Notably – Her support for the independent candidate, V. V. Giri, rather than the official Congress party candidate, Neelam Sanjiva Reddy, for the vacant post of the president of India and Gandhi's abrupt nationalisation of the 14 biggest banks in India.

In November 1969, the Congress party president, S. Nijalingappa, expelled Indira Gandhi from the party for indiscipline. Subsequently, Gandhi launched her own faction of the INC which came to be known as Congress (R). (Note: The "R" stood for Requisition or Ruling) The original party then came to be known as Indian National Congress (O). (Note: The "O" stands for organisation/Old Congress.) Its principal leaders were Kamraj, Morarji Desai, Nijalingappa and S. K. Patil who stood for a more right-wing agenda. The split occurred when a united opposition under the banner of Samyukt Vidhayak Dal, won control over several states in the Hindi Belt. Indira Gandhi, on the other side, wanted to use a populist agenda in order to mobilise popular support for the party. Her faction, called Congress (R), was supported by most of the Congress MPs while the original party had the support of only 65 MPs. In the All India Congress Committee, 446 of its 705 members walked over to Indira's side. The "Old Congress" retained the party symbol of a pair of bullocks carrying a yoke while Indira's breakaway faction was given a new symbol of a cow with a suckling calf by the Election Commission as the party election symbol. The Congress (O) eventually merged with other opposition parties to form the Janata Party.

"India might be an ancient country but was a young democracy and as such should remain vigilant against the domination of few over the social, economic or political systems. Banks should be publicly owned so that they catered to not just large industries and big businesses but also agriculturists, small industries and entrepreneurs. Furthermore, the private banks had been functioning erratically with hundreds of them failing and causing loss to the depositors who were given no guarantee against such loss."

— Gandhi's remarks after the nationalisation of private banks.

In the mid-term 1971 Indian general election, the Gandhi-led Congress (R) won a landslide victory on a platform of progressive policies such as the elimination of poverty (Garibi Hatao). The policies of the Congress (R) under Gandhi before the 1971 elections included proposals to abolish the Privy Purse to former rulers of the Princely states, and the 1969 nationalisation of India's 14 largest banks. The 1969 attempt by Indira Gandhi government to abolish privy purse and the official recognition of the titles did not meet with success. The constitutional Amendment bill to this effect was passed in Lok Sabha, but it failed to get the required two-thirds majority in the Rajya Sabha. However, in 1971, with the passage of the Twenty-sixth Amendment to the Constitution of India, the privy purses were abolished.

Due to Sino-Indian War 1962, India faced a huge budgetary deficit resulting in its treasury being almost empty, high inflation, and dwindling forex reserves. The brief War of 1962 exposed weaknesses in the economy and shifted the focus towards the defence industry and the Indian Army. The government found itself short of resources to fund the Third Plan (1961–1966). Subhadra Joshi a senior party member, proposed a non-official resolution asking for the nationalisation of private banks stating that nationalisation would help in mobilising resources for development. In July 1969, Indira Gandhi through the ordinance nationalised fourteen major private banks. After being re-elected in 1971 on a campaign that endorsed nationalisation, Indira Gandhi went on to nationalise the coal, steel, copper, refining, cotton textiles and insurance industries. The main reason was to protect employment and the interest of the organised labour.

On 12 June 1975, the High Court of Allahabad declared Indira Gandhi's election to the Lok Sabha, the lower house of India's parliament, void on the grounds of electoral malpractice. However, Gandhi rejected calls to resign and announced plans to appeal to the Supreme Court. In response to increasing disorder and lawlessness, Gandhi's ministry recommended that President Fakhruddin Ali Ahmed declare a State of Emergency, based on the provisions of Article 352 of the Constitution. During the nineteen-month emergency, widespread oppression and abuse of power by Gandhi's unelected younger son and political heir Sanjay Gandhi and his close associates occurred. Implemented on 25 June 1975, the Emergency officially ended on 21 March 1977. All political prisoners were released and fresh elections for the Lok Sabha were called. In parliamentary elections held in March, the Janata alliance of anti-Indira opposition parties won a landslide victory over Congress, winning 295 seats in the Lok Sabha against Congress' 153. Gandhi lost her seat to her Janata opponent Raj Narain.

On 2 January 1978, Indira and her followers seceded and formed a new opposition party, popularly called Congress (I)—the "I" signifying Indira. During the next year, her new party attracted enough members of the legislature to become the official opposition. In November 1978, Gandhi regained a parliamentary seat. In January 1980, following a landslide victory for Congress (I), she was again elected prime minister. The national election commission declared Congress (I) to be the real Indian National Congress for the 1984 general election. However, the designation I was dropped only in 1996.

Gandhi's premiership witnessed increasing turmoil in Punjab, with demands for Sikh autonomy by Jarnail Singh Bhindranwale and his militant followers. In 1983, Bhindranwale with his armed followers headquartered themselves in the Golden Temple in Amritsar and started accumulating weapons. In June 1984, after several futile negotiations, Gandhi ordered the Indian Army to enter the Golden Temple to establish control over the complex and remove Bhindranwale and his armed followers. This event is known as Operation Blue Star. On 31 October 1984, two of Gandhi's bodyguards, Satwant Singh and Beant Singh, shot her with their service weapons in the garden of the prime minister's residence in response to her authorisation of Operation Blue Star. Gandhi was due to be interviewed by British actor Peter Ustinov, who was filming a documentary for Irish television. Her assassination prompted the 1984 anti-Sikh riots, during which 3,000–17,000 people were killed. Congress Party MP, Sajjan Kumar, was convicted in two cases for instigating and leading a mob to attack and murder Sikh civilians during the Anti-Sikh riots in New Delhi.

==== Rajiv, Sonia Gandhi and Rao era (1984–2022) ====
In 1984, Indira Gandhi's son Rajiv Gandhi became nominal head of Congress, and went on to become prime minister upon her assassination. In December, he led Congress to a landslide victory, where it secured 401 seats in the parliament. His administration took measures to reform the government bureaucracy and liberalise the country's economy. Rajiv Gandhi's attempts to discourage separatist movements in Punjab and Kashmir backfired. After his government became embroiled in several financial scandals, his leadership became increasingly ineffectual. Gandhi was regarded as a non-abrasive person who consulted other party members and refrained from hasty decisions. The Bofors scandal damaged his reputation as an honest politician, but he was posthumously cleared of bribery allegations in 2004. On 21 May 1991, Gandhi was killed by a bomb concealed in a basket of flowers carried by a woman associated with the Tamil Tigers. He was campaigning in Tamil Nadu for upcoming parliamentary elections. In 1998, an Indian court convicted 26 people in the conspiracy to assassinate Gandhi. The conspirators, who consisted of Tamil militants from Sri Lanka and their Indian allies, had sought revenge against Gandhi because the Indian troops he sent to Sri Lanka in 1987 to help enforce a peace accord there had fought with Tamil Militant guerrillas.

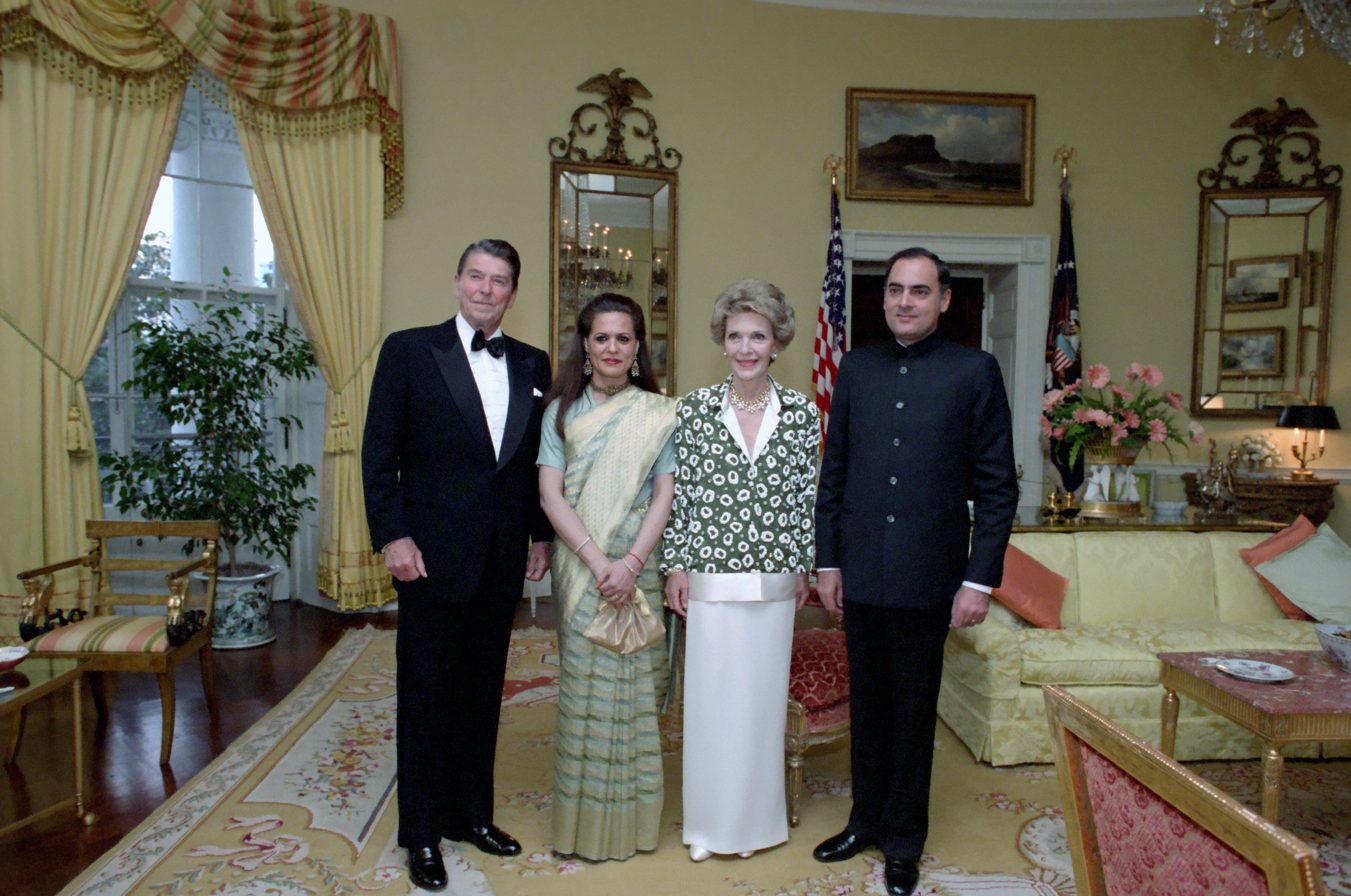
Rajiv and Sonia Gandhi with U.S. President Ronald Reagan and first lady Nancy Reagan, 1985

The mid-1990s marked a period of political flux in India, with frequent changes in government and coalition dynamics. Rajiv Gandhi was succeeded as party leader by P. V. Narasimha Rao, who was elected prime minister in June 1991.

His rise to the prime ministership was politically significant because he was the first person from South India to hold the office, marking a shift from the traditionally northern-dominated leadership in Indian politics. After the election, he formed a minority government. Rao himself did not contest elections in 1991, but after he was sworn in as prime minister, he won in a by-election from Nandyal in Andhra Pradesh. His administration oversaw major economic change and experienced several domestic incidents that affected India's national security. Rao, who held the Industries portfolio, was personally responsible for the dismantling of the Licence Raj, which came under the purview of the Ministry of Commerce and Industry. Rao accelerated the dismantling of the Licence Raj, reversing the socialist policies of previous governments. He employed Manmohan Singh as his finance minister to begin historic economic changes. With Rao's mandate, Singh launched reforms for India's globalisation that involved implementing International Monetary Fund (IMF) policies to prevent India's impending economic collapse. Future prime ministers Atal Bihari Vajpayee and Manmohan Singh continued the economic reform policies begun by Rao's government. He is often called the "Father of Indian economic reforms". Rao was also referred to as Chanakya for his ability to push tough economic and political legislation through the parliament while heading a minority government.

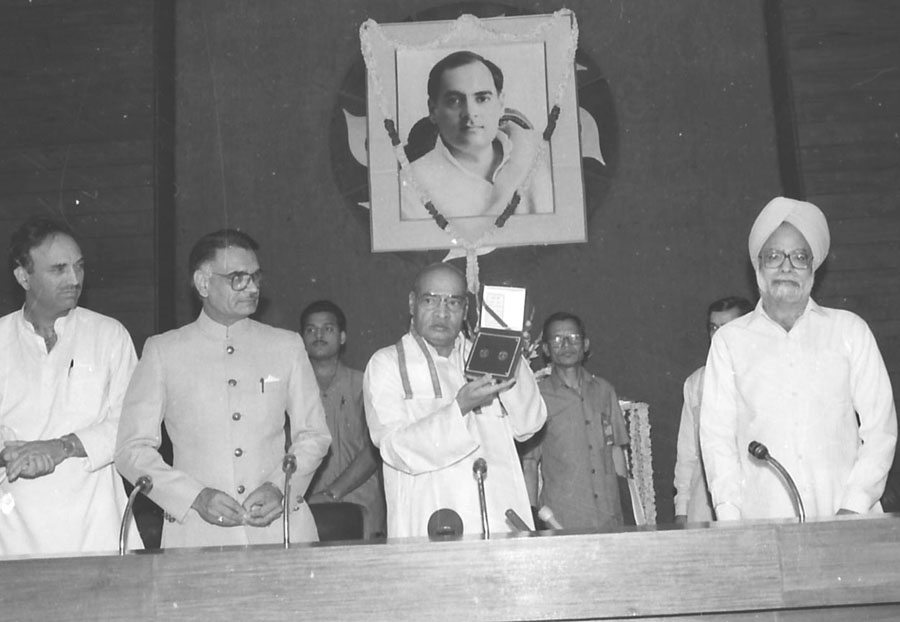
Rao and Singh during first death anniversary of Rajiv Gandhi, 1992

By 1996, party found itself in a complex political landscape. It faced internal challenges, including factionalism and leadership struggles, allegations of corruption, and a degree of anti-incumbency sentiment. The 1996 general elections witnessed the emergence of a fractured mandate, leading to the absence of a clear majority for any single party. Congress was reduced to 140 seats in elections that year, its lowest number in the Lok Sabha yet. Rao later resigned as prime minister and, in September, as party president. He was succeeded as president by Sitaram Kesri, the party's first non-Brahmin leader. During the tenure of both Rao and Kesri, the two leaders conducted internal elections to the Congress working committees and their own posts as party presidents.

The 1998 general elections saw Congress win 141 seats in the Lok Sabha, its lowest tally until then. To boost its popularity and improve its performance in the forthcoming election, Congress leaders urged Sonia Gandhi, Rajiv Gandhi's widow, to assume leadership of the party. She had previously declined offers to become actively involved in party affairs and had stayed away from politics. After her election as party leader, a section of the party that objected to the choice because of her Italian ethnicity broke away and formed the Nationalist Congress Party (NCP), led by Sharad Pawar.

Sonia Gandhi struggled to revive the party in her early years as its president; she was under continuous scrutiny for her foreign birth and lack of political acumen. In the snap elections called by the National Democratic Alliance (NDA) government in 1999, Congress' tally further plummeted to just 114 seats. Although the leadership structure was unaltered as the party campaigned strongly in the assembly elections that followed, Gandhi began to make such strategic changes as abandoning the party's 1998 Pachmarhi resolution of ekla chalo (go it alone) policy, and formed alliances with other like-minded parties. In the intervening years, the party was successful at various legislative assembly elections; at one point, Congress ruled 15 states. For the 2004 general election, Congress forged alliances with regional parties including the NCP and the Dravida Munnetra Kazhagam. The party's campaign emphasised social inclusion and the welfare of the common masses—an ideology that Gandhi herself endorsed for Congress during her presidency—with slogans such as Congress ka haath, aam aadmi ke saath ("Congress hand in hand with the common man"), contrasting with the NDA's "India Shining" campaign. The Congress-led United Progressive Alliance (UPA) won 222 seats in the new parliament, defeating the NDA by a substantial margin. With the subsequent support of the communist front, Congress won a majority and formed a new government.

Despite massive support from within the party, Gandhi declined the post of prime minister, choosing to appoint Manmohan Singh instead. She remained as party president and headed the National Advisory Council (NAC). During its first term in office, the UPA government passed several social reform bills. These included an employment guarantee bill, the Right to Information Act, and a right to education act. The NAC, as well as the Left Front that supported the government from the outside, were widely seen as being the driving force behind such legislation. The Left Front withdrew its support of the government over disagreements about the U.S.–India Civil Nuclear Agreement. Despite the effective loss of 62 seats in parliament, the government survived the trust vote that followed.

In the Lok Sabha elections held soon after, Congress won 207 seats, the highest tally of any party since 1991. The UPA won 262, enabling it to form a government for the second time. The social welfare policies of the first UPA government, and the perceived divisiveness of the BJP, are broadly credited with the victory.

By the 2014 election, the party had lost much of its popular support, mainly growing discontent over a series of corruption allegations involving government officials, including the 2G spectrum case and the Indian coal allocation scam, as well as the ineptness towards national security, particularly the insensitivity in the aftermath of the 2011 Mumbai bombings. The Congress won only 44 seats in the Lok Sabha, compared to the 336 of the BJP and the NDA. The UPA suffered a landslide defeat, which was the party's worst-ever national electoral performance with its vote share dipping below 20 per cent for the first time. Sonia Gandhi retired as party president in December 2017, having served for a record nineteen years. She was succeeded by her son Rahul Gandhi, who was elected unopposed in the 2017 INC presidential election.

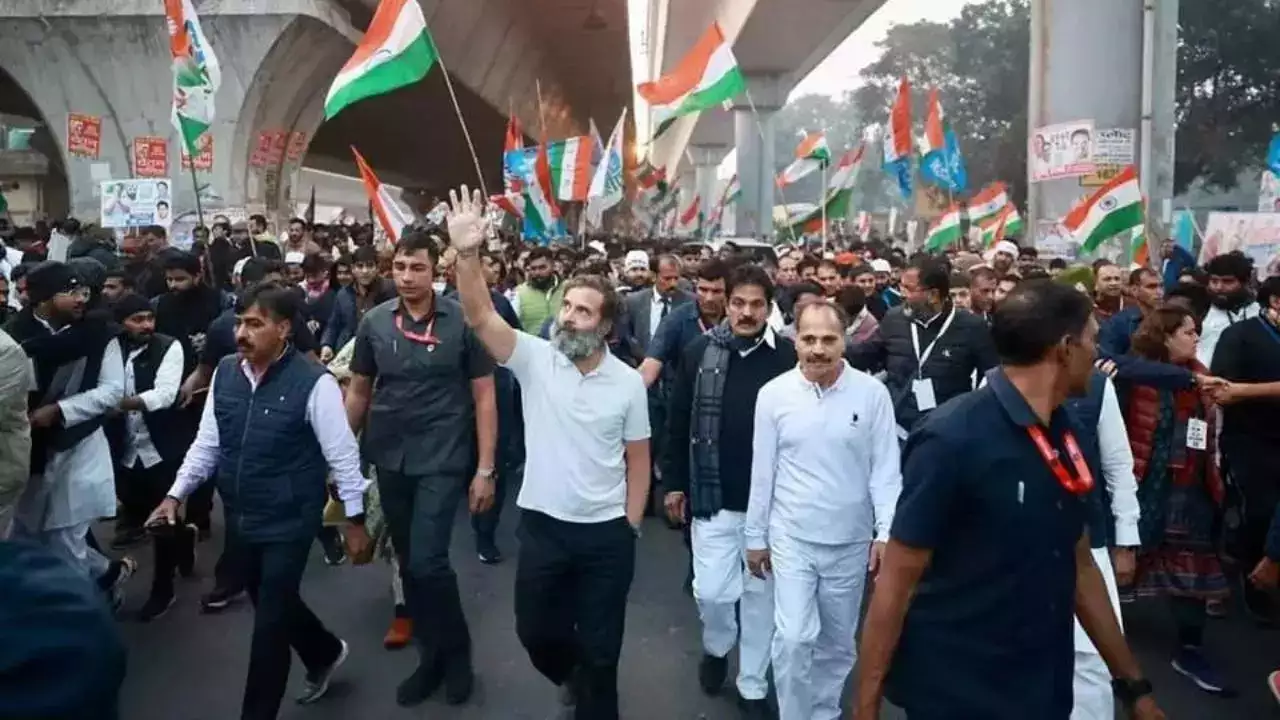
Rahul Gandhi during Bharat Jodo Yatra

Rahul Gandhi resigned from his post after the 2019 election, due to the party's dismal electoral performance. The party only won 52 seats, eight more than the previous election. Its vote percentage once again fell below 20 per cent. Following Gandhi's resignation, party leaders began deliberations for a suitable candidate to replace him. The Congress Working Committee met on 10 August to make a final decision on the matter and passed a resolution asking Sonia Gandhi to take over as interim president until a consensus candidate could be picked. Following the election, Adhir Ranjan Chowdhury was chosen as the leader of the Congress in the Lok Sabha, Gaurav Gogoi was chosen as the deputy leader in Lok Sabha, and Ravneet Singh Bittu was chosen as the party whip. Based on an analysis of the candidates' poll affidavits, a report by the National Election Watch (NEW) and the Association for Democratic Reforms (ADR) says that, the Congress has highest political defection rate since 2014. According to the report, a total of 222 electoral candidates had left the Congress to join other parties during elections held between 2014 and 2021, as 177 MPs and MLAs quit the party. The defections resulted in a loss of the party's established governments in Arunachal Pradesh, Madhya Pradesh, Goa, Karnataka, Puducherry, and Manipur.

==== Mallikarjun Kharge era (2022–present) ====
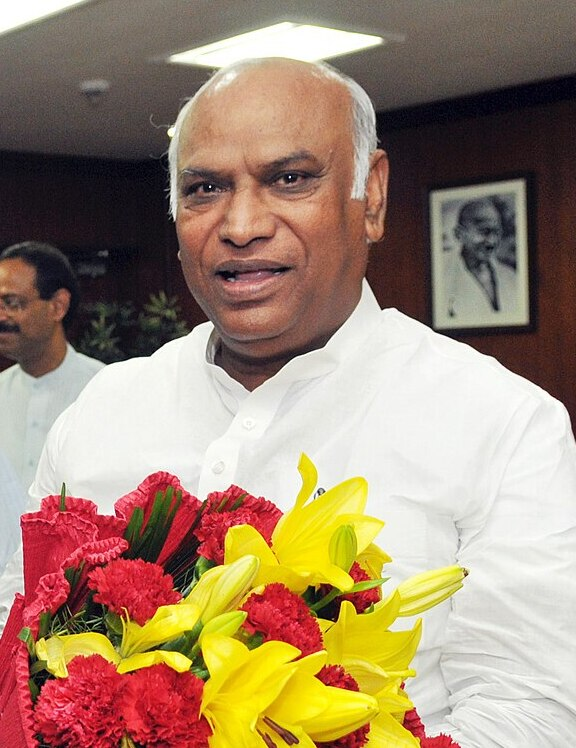
Mallikarjun Kharge, INC's incumbent president and leader in Rajya Sabha

On 28 August 2022, the Congress Working Committee (CWC) held an election for the next president of the INC, to succeed Rahul Gandhi. The election was held on 17 October 2022 and counting took place on 19 October 2022. The candidates in the race were Kerala MP Shashi Tharoor and Karnataka MP Mallikarjun Kharge. Mallikarjun Kharge won the election in a landslide, securing 7,897 out of the 9,385 votes cast. His rival, Shashi Tharoor, secured 1,072 votes.

Kharge led the party into the 2024 Indian general election, where the party made significant gains in Uttar Pradesh and several other states, ultimately securing 99 seats. This performance marked the party's best electoral result since 2014 and enabled Rahul Gandhi to assume the role of Leader of the Opposition in the Lok Sabha. However, this was the party's third worst performance in terms of number of seats. The party also served as the principal opposition within the Indian National Developmental Inclusive Alliance (INDIA), a coalition formed in 2023.

== General election results ==
In the first parliamentary elections held in 1952, the INC won 364 seats, which was 76 per cent of the 479 contested seats. The vote share of the INC was 45 per cent of all votes cast. Till the 1971 general elections, the party's voting percentage remain intact at 40 per cent. However, the 1977 general elections resulted in a heavy defeat for the INC. Many notable INC party leader lost their seats, winning only 154 seats in the Lok Sabha. The INC again returned to power in the 1980 Indian general election securing a 42.7 per cent vote share of all votes, winning 353 seats. INC's vote share kept increasing till 1980 and then to a record high of 48.1 per cent by 1984/85. Rajiv Gandhi on assuming the post of prime minister in October 1984 recommended early elections. The general elections were to be held in January 1985; instead, they were held in December 1984. The Congress won an overwhelming majority, securing 415 seats out of 533, the largest ever majority in independent India's Lok Sabha elections history. This winning recorded a vote share of 49.1 per cent resulting in an overall increase to 48.1 per cent. The party got 32.14 per cent of voters in polls held in Punjab and Assam in 1985.

In November 1989, general elections were held to elect the members of the 9th Lok Sabha. The Congress did badly in the elections, though it still managed to be the largest single party in the Lok Sabha. Its vote share started decreasing to 39.5 per cent in the 1989 general elections. The 13th Lok Sabha term was to end in October 2004, but the National Democratic Alliance (NDA) government decided on early polls. The Lok Sabha was dissolved in February itself and the country went to the polls in April–May 2004. The INC, led by Sonia Gandhi unexpectedly emerged as the single largest party. After the elections, Congress joined up with minor parties to form the United Progressive Alliance (UPA). The UPA with external support from the Bahujan Samaj Party, Samajwadi Party, Kerala Congress, and the Left Front managed a comfortable majority. Congress has lost nearly 20% of its vote share in general elections held between 1996 and 2009.

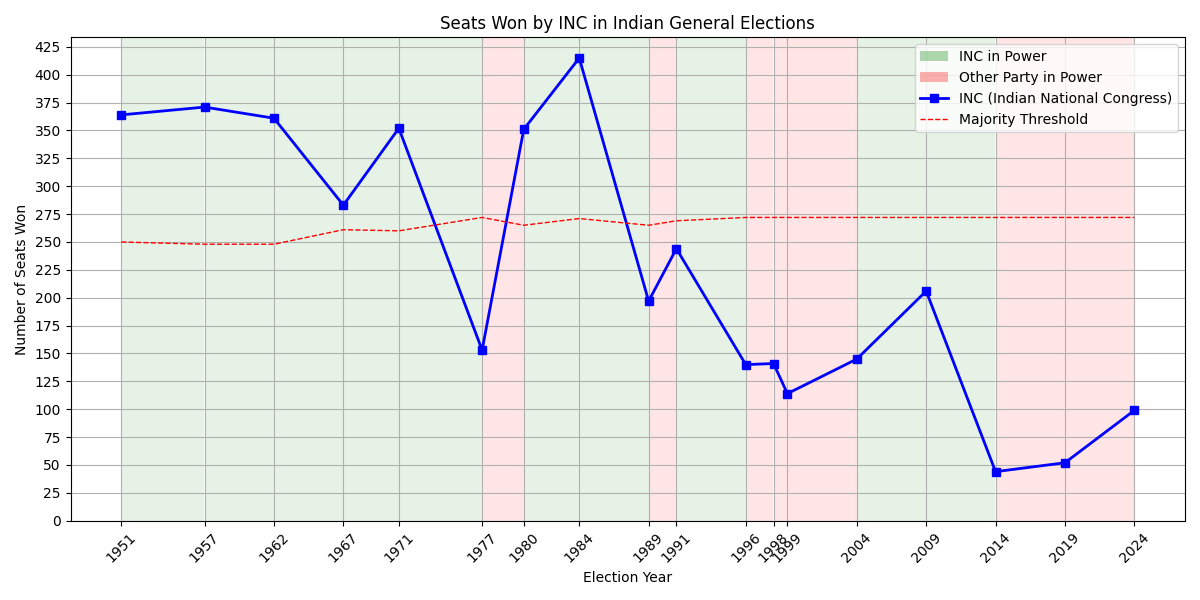
Seats Won by INC in Indian General Elections over the years

Year	Legislature	Party leader	Seats won	Change in seats	Percentage of votes	Vote swing	Outcome	Ref
1934	5th Central Legislative Assembly	Bhulabhai Desai	42 / 147	▲42	—N/a	—N/a	—N/a	
1945	6th Central Legislative Assembly	Sarat Chandra Bose	59 / 102	▲17	—N/a	—N/a	Interim Government of India (1946–1947)	
1951	1st Lok Sabha	Jawaharlal Nehru	364 / 489	▲364	44.99%	—N/a	Majority	
1957	2nd Lok Sabha	Jawaharlal Nehru	371 / 494	▲7	47.78%	▲2.79%	Majority	
1962	3rd Lok Sabha	Jawaharlal Nehru	361 / 494	▼10	44.72%	▼3.06%	Majority	
1967	4th Lok Sabha	Indira Gandhi	283 / 520	▼78	40.78%	▼2.94%	Majority (1967–69)	
1967	4th Lok Sabha	Indira Gandhi	283 / 520	▼78	40.78%	▼2.94%	Minority (1969–71)	
1971	5th Lok Sabha	Indira Gandhi	352 / 518	▲69	43.68%	▲2.90%	Majority	
1977	6th Lok Sabha	Indira Gandhi	153 / 542	▼199	34.52%	▼9.16%	Official Opposition	
1980	7th Lok Sabha	Indira Gandhi	351 / 542	▲198	42.69%	▲8.17%	Majority	
1984	8th Lok Sabha	Rajiv Gandhi	415 / 533	▲64	49.01%	▲6.32%	Majority	
1989	9th Lok Sabha	Rajiv Gandhi	197 / 545	▼218	39.53%	▼9.48%	Official Opposition	
1991	10th Lok Sabha	P. V. Narasimha Rao	244 / 545	▲47	35.66%	▼3.87%	Minority	
1996	11th Lok Sabha	P. V. Narasimha Rao	140 / 545	▼104	28.80%	▼7.46%	Official Opposition (1996)	
1996	11th Lok Sabha	P. V. Narasimha Rao	140 / 545	▼104	28.80%	▼7.46%	Outside support for UF (1996–97)	
1998	12th Lok Sabha	Sitaram Kesri	141 / 545	▲1	25.82%	▼2.98%	Official Opposition	
1999	13th Lok Sabha	Sonia Gandhi	114 / 545	▼27	28.30%	▲2.48%	Official Opposition	
2004	14th Lok Sabha	Sonia Gandhi	145 / 543	▲31	26.7%	▼1.6%	Coalition	
2009	15th Lok Sabha	Manmohan Singh	206 / 543	▲61	28.55%	▲2.02%	Coalition	
2014	16th Lok Sabha	Rahul Gandhi	44 / 543	▼162	19.3%	▼9.25%	Opposition	
2019	17th Lok Sabha	Rahul Gandhi	52 / 543	▲8	19.5%	▲0.2%	Opposition	
2024	18th Lok Sabha	Mallikarjun Kharge	99 / 543	▲47	21.19%	▲1.7%	Official Opposition	

All time-INC Lok Sabha seat count

== Political positions ==
=== Social affairs ===
The Congress party emphasises social equality, freedom, secularism, and equal opportunity. Its political position is generally considered to be in the centre. Historically, the party has represented farmers, labourers, and Mahatma Gandhi National Rural Employment Guarantee Act (MGNREGA). The MGNREGA was initiated with the objective of "enhancing livelihood security in rural areas by providing at least 100 days of guaranteed wage employment in a financial year, to every household whose adult members volunteer to do unskilled manual work." Another aim of MGNREGA is to create durable assets (such as roads, canals, ponds, and wells).

The Congress has positioned itself as both pro-Hindu and protector of the minorities. The party supports Mahatma Gandhi's doctrine of Sarva Dharma Sama Bhava, collectively termed by its party members as secularism. Former Chief Minister of Punjab and senior Congress member Amarinder Singh said, "India belongs to all religions, which is its strength, and the Congress would not allow anyone to destroy its cherished secular values." On 9 November 1989, Rajiv Gandhi had allowed Shilanyas (foundation stone-laying ceremony) adjacent to the then disputed Ram Janmabhoomi site. Subsequently, his government faced heavy criticism over the passing of The Muslim Women (Protection of Rights on Divorce) Act 1986, which nullified the Supreme Court's judgment in the Shah Bano case. The 1984 violence damaged the Congress's party moral argument over secularism. The BJP questioned the Congress party's moral authority in questioning it about the 2002 Gujarat riots. The Congress has distanced itself from Hindutva ideology, though the party has softened its stance after defeat in the 2014 and 2019 general elections.

Under Narsimha Rao's premiership, the Panchayati Raj and Municipal Government got constitutional status. With the enactment of the 73rd and 74th amendments to the constitution, a new chapter, Part- IX (Panchayats) and Part IX-A (Municipalities) added to the constitution. States have been given the flexibility to take into consideration their geographical, politico-administrative, and other consideration while adopting the Panchayati-raj system. In both panchayats and municipal bodies, in an attempt to ensure that there is inclusiveness in local self-government, reservations for SC/ST and women were implemented.

After independence, Congress advocated the idea of establishing Hindi as the sole national language of India. The Constitution of India, in Part XVII and specifically Article 351, addresses the promotion and development of Hindi. This article instructs the Union to promote the spread of Hindi so that it can serve as a medium to express India's diverse culture and be enriched by incorporating elements from other languages without losing its essential character. Nehru led the faction of the Congress party which promoted Hindi as the lingua franca of the Indian nation. However, the non-Hindi-speaking Indian states, especially Tamil Nadu, opposed it and wanted the continued use of the English language. Lal Bahadur Shastri's tenure witnessed several protests and riots including the Madras anti-Hindi agitation of 1965. Shashtri's appealed to agitators to withdraw the movement and assured them that the English would continue to be used as the official language as long as the non-Hindi speaking states wanted. Indira Gandhi assuaged the sentiments of the non-Hindi speaking states by getting the Official Languages Act amended in 1967 to provide that the use of English could continue until a resolution to end the use of the language was passed by the legislature of every state that had not adopted use Hindi as its official language, and by each house of the Indian Parliament. This was a guarantee of de facto use of both Hindi and English as official languages, thus establishing bilingualism in India. The step led to the end of the anti-Hindi protests and riots in states.

Following the Supreme Court’s final 2018 decision to abolish Section 377, the INC reiterated that personal freedom must be upheld for all citizens. Section 377 of the Indian Penal Code, which, among other things, criminalises homosexuality; former Congress president Rahul Gandhi said, "Sexuality is a matter of personal freedom and should be left to individuals". Leading party figure and former Finance Minister P. Chidambaram stated that the Navtej Singh Johar v. Union of India judgment must be quickly reversed". On 18 December 2015, Shashi Tharoor leading member of the party introduced a private member's bill to replace Section 377 in the Indian Penal Code and decriminalise consensual same-sex relations. The bill was defeated in the first reading. In March 2016, Tharoor again reintroduce the private member's bill to decriminalise homosexuality but was voted down for the second time.

=== Economic policies ===
The economic policy of Congress-led governments can broadly be divided into two phases. The first phase, spanning from independence in 1947 to 1991, placed significant emphasis on the public sector as a driver of growth. The second phase began with the economic liberalisation reforms of 1991, marking a shift towards market-oriented policies. At present, the Congress Party supports a mixed economy model, wherein both the state and the private sector play active roles—combining elements of market and planned economies. The party advocates for import substitution industrialisation, encouraging domestic production as a replacement for imports, while also supporting continued liberalisation to accelerate economic development. It promotes a progressive tax structure aimed at expanding public services and addressing economic inequality by ensuring that higher-income individuals contribute a fairer share in taxes.

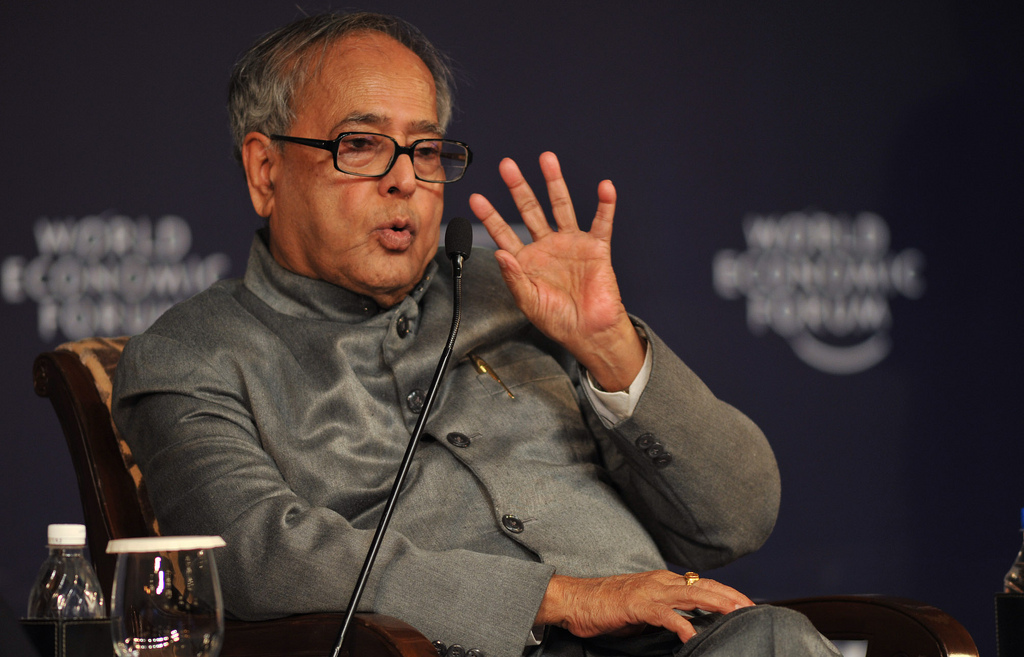
Then-Finance Minister Pranab Mukherjee during the World Economic Summit 2009 in New Delhi

At the beginning of the first period, erstwhile prime minister Jawaharlal Nehru implemented policies based on import substitution industrialisation and advocated a mixed economy where the government-controlled public sector would co-exist with the private sector. He believed that the development and modernisation of India's economy required the establishment of basic and heavy industries. The government, therefore, directed investment primarily into key public-sector industries—steel, iron, coal, and power—promoting their development with subsidies and protectionist policies. This period was called the Licence Raj, or Permit Raj, which was the elaborate system of licences, regulations, and accompanying red tape that were required to set up and run businesses in India between 1947 and 1990. The Licence Raj was a result of Nehru and his successors' desire to have a planned economy where all aspects of the economy were controlled by the state, and licences were given to a select few. Private companies were required to obtain numerous approvals from various government departments before they could begin production, and even after receiving licences, their operations were closely regulated by the state. The government also prevented firms from laying off workers or closing factories. The Licence Raj system continued under Indira Gandhi, during whose tenure key sectors such as banking, steel, coal, and oil were nationalised. Under the premiership of Rajiv Gandhi, the first steps toward economic liberalisation were initiated. These included a reduction in import duties, the introduction of export incentives, and the implementation of initial tax reforms. Restrictions on company assets were also relaxed during his administration.

In 1991, the new Congress government, led by P. V. Narasimha Rao, initiated reforms to avert the impending 1991 economic crisis. The reforms known as New Economic Policy (NEP) or "1991 economic reforms" or "LPG reforms", progressed furthest in opening up areas to foreign investment, reforming capital markets, deregulating domestic business, and reforming the trade regime. The reforms were implemented during a time when India grappled with a balance of payments crisis, elevated inflation, underperforming public sector undertakings (PSUs), and a substantial fiscal deficit. It also aimed to transition the economy from a socialist model to a market economy. The goals of Rao's government were to reduce the fiscal deficit, privatise the public sector, and increase investment in infrastructure. Trade reforms and changes in the regulation of foreign direct investment were introduced to open India to foreign trade while stabilising external loans. Rao chose Manmohan Singh for the job. Singh, an acclaimed economist and former governor of the Reserve Bank of India, played a central role in implementing these reforms.

In 2004, Singh became prime minister of the Congress-led UPA government. Singh remained prime minister after the UPA won the 2009 general elections. The UPA government introduced policies aimed at reforming the banking and financial sectors, as well as public sector companies. It also introduced policies aimed at relieving farmers of their debt. In 2005, Singh government introduced the value-added tax, replacing the sales tax. India was able to resist the worst effects of the global economic crisis of 2008. Singh's government continued the Golden Quadrilateral, the Indian highway modernisation program that was initiated by Vajpayee's government. Then Finance Minister of India Pranab Mukherjee implemented many tax reforms, notably scrapping the Fringe Benefits Tax and the Commodities Transaction Tax. The Goods and Services Tax was implementd during his tenure as the President of India in 2017. His reforms were well received by major corporate executives and economists. The introduction of retrospective taxation, however, has been criticised by some economists. Mukherjee expanded funding for several social sector schemes including the Jawaharlal Nehru National Urban Renewal Mission (JNNURM). He also supported budget increases for improving literacy and health care. Electricity coverage was also expanded during his tenure. Mukherjee also reaffirmed his commitment to the principle of fiscal prudence as some economists expressed concern about the rising fiscal deficits during his tenure, the highest since 1991. Mukherjee declared the expansion in government spending was only temporary.

=== National defence and home affairs ===
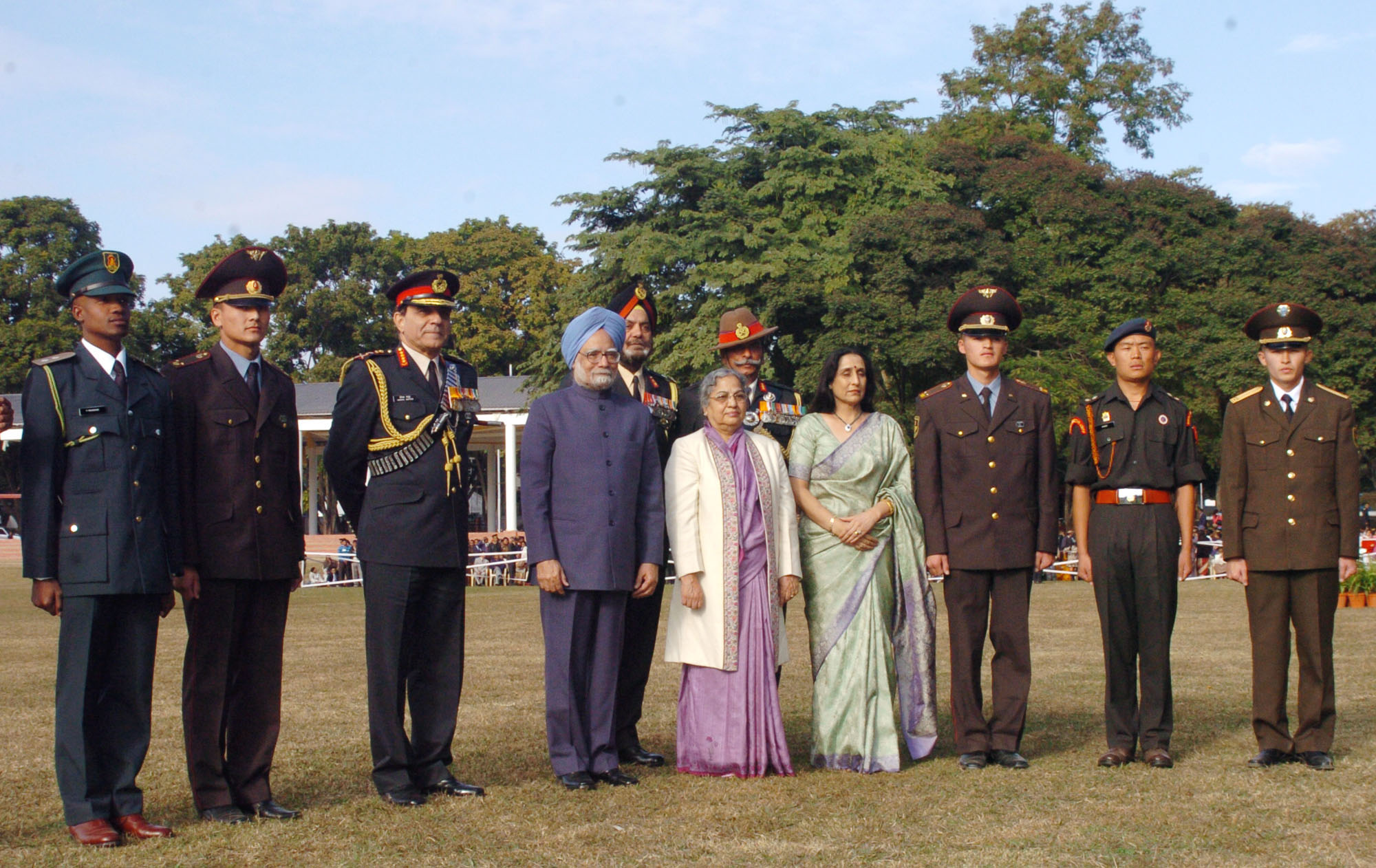
Manmohan Singh and his wife during the passing out parade at the Platinum Jubilee Course of IMA on 10 December 2007; with foreign gentleman cadets

Since its independence, India was in pursuing of nuclear capabilities, as Nehru felt that nuclear energy could take the country forward and help achieve its developmental goals. Consequently, Nehru began to seek assistance from the United Kingdom, Canada and the United States. In 1958 the government of India with the help of Homi J. Bhabha adopted a three-phase power production plan and the Nuclear Research Institute was established in 1954. Indira Gandhi witnessed continuous nuclear testing by China from 1964 onwards, which she considered an existential threat to India. India conducted its first nuclear test in the Pokhran desert in Rajasthan on 18 May 1974, under the name Operation Smiling Buddha. India asserted that the test was for "peaceful purposes", However, the test was criticised by other countries and the United States and Canada suspended all nuclear support to India. Despite intense international criticism, the nuclear test was domestically popular and caused an immediate revival of Indira Gandhi's popularity, which had flagged considerably from its heights after the 1971 war.

On internal security and home affairs, the Congress party promotes a federal approach to governance, emphasising cooperative federalism. The transition to statehood for parts of Northeast India was successfully overseen under Indira Gandhi's premiership. In 1972, her administration granted statehood to Meghalaya, Manipur and Tripura, while the North-East Frontier Agency was declared a union territory and renamed Arunachal Pradesh. This was followed by the annexation of Sikkim in 1975. In the late 1960s and 1970s, Gandhi ordered the Indian army to militant Communist uprisings in the state of West Bengal. The Naxalite–Maoist insurgency in India was entirely suppressed during the state of emergency. Rajiv Gandhi played a pivotal role in facilitating the Mizoram Peace Accord of 1986 by personally supporting negotiations with MNF leader Laldenga and advocating a peaceful, political solution. His premiership ensured key concessions, including full statehood for Mizoram and the integration of former insurgents into democratic politics, leading to one of India's most successful peace settlements.

Manmohan Singh's administration initiated a massive reconstruction effort in Kashmir to stabilise the region and strengthened anti-terrorism laws with amendments to the Unlawful Activities (Prevention) Act (UAPA). After a period of initial success, insurgent infiltration and terrorism in Kashmir have escalated since 2009. However, the Singh administration was successful in reducing terrorism in Northeast India. Under the background of the Punjab insurgency, the Terrorist and Disruptive Activities (Prevention) Act (TADA) was passed. The aim of the law is mainly directed toward eliminating the infiltrators from Pakistan. The law gave wide powers to law enforcement agencies for dealing with national terrorist and socially disruptive activities. The police were not obliged to produce a detainee before a judicial magistrate within 24 hours. The law was widely criticised by human rights organisations. After the November 2008 Mumbai terror attacks, the UPA government created the National Investigation Agency (NIA), in response to the need for a central agency to combat terrorism. The Unique Identification Authority of India was established in February 2009 to implement the proposed Multipurpose National Identity Card, to increase national security.

=== Education and healthcare ===
The Congress government under Nehru oversaw the establishment of many institutions of higher learning, including the All India Institute of Medical Sciences, the Indian Institutes of Technology, the Indian Institutes of Management and the National Institutes of Technology. The National Council of Educational Research and Training (NCERT) was established in 1961 as a literary, scientific, and charitable Society under the Societies Registration Act. Jawahar Lal Nehru outlined a commitment in his five-year plans to guarantee free and compulsory primary education to all of India's children. Rajiv Gandhi's premiership pioneered public information infrastructure and innovation in India. His government allowed the import of fully assembled motherboards, which led to the price of computers being reduced. The concept of having Navodaya Vidyalaya in every district of India was born as a part of the National Policy on Education (NPE).

In 2005, The Congress-led government started the National Rural Health Mission, which employed about 500,000 community health workers. It was praised by economist Jeffrey Sachs. In 2006, it implemented a proposal to reserve 27 per cent of seats in the All India Institute of Medical Studies (AIIMS), the Indian Institutes of Technology (IITs), the Indian Institutes of Management (IIMs), and other central higher education institutions, for Other Backward Classes, which led to the 2006 Indian anti-reservation protests. The Singh government also continued the Sarva Shiksha Abhiyan program, which includes the introduction and improvement of mid-day school meals and the opening of new schools throughout India, especially in rural areas, to fight illiteracy. During Manmohan Singh's prime ministership, eight Institutes of Technology were opened in the states of Andhra Pradesh, Bihar, Gujarat, Orissa, Punjab, Madhya Pradesh, Rajasthan, and Himachal Pradesh.

=== Foreign policies ===
The aligned countries on the northern hemisphere: NATO in blue and the Warsaw Pact in red

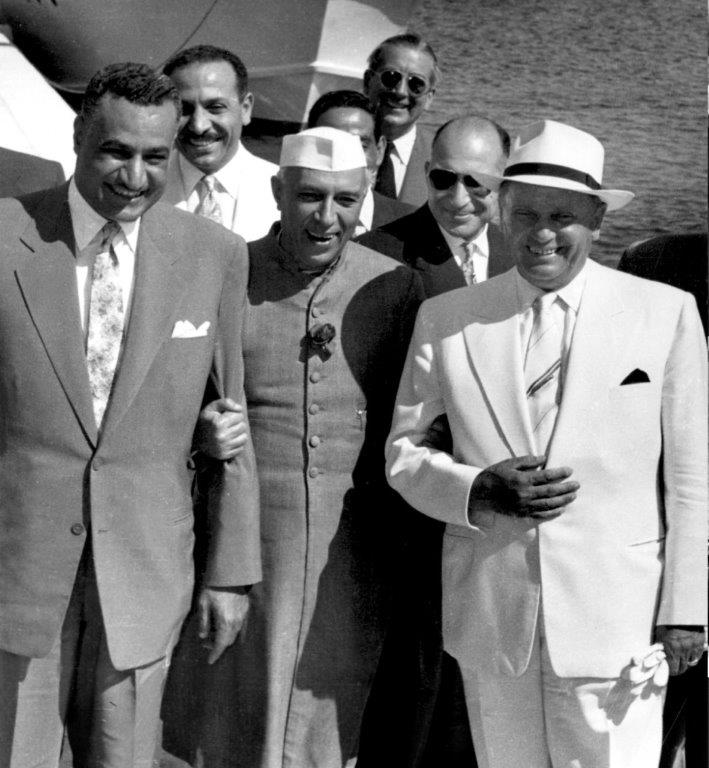
Gamal Abdel Nasser, Jawaharlal Nehru, and Josip Broz Tito, pioneers of the Non-Aligned Movement

The Congress party played a foundational role in shaping India's non-aligned foreign policy during the Cold War, particularly under the leadership of Prime Minister Jawaharlal Nehru. Nehru was one of the principal architects of the Non-Aligned Movement (NAM), which sought to maintain strategic autonomy by avoiding alignment with either the Western or Soviet bloc. Throughout much of the Cold War period, Congress supported a foreign policy of non-alignment that called for India to form ties with both the Western and Eastern Blocs, but to avoid formal alliances with either. However, in 1971, amid growing U.S. support for Pakistan—including military aid and diplomatic backing—the Congress-led Indian government signed Indo-Soviet Treaty of Friendship and Cooperation, marking a strategic shift toward the Soviet Union.

Continuing the foreign policy initiated by P. V. Narasimha Rao, the Congress government pursued the peace process with Pakistan, including high-level bilateral visits. The UPA government has tried to end the border dispute with the People's Republic of China through negotiations. Relations with Afghanistan have also been a concern for Congress. During Afghan President Hamid Karzai's visit to New Delhi in August 2008, Manmohan Singh increased the aid package to Afghanistan for the development of schools, health clinics, infrastructure, and defence. India is now one of the single largest aid donors to Afghanistan. To nourish political, security, cultural and economical connections with central Asian countries, it launched Connect Central Asia policy in 2012. This policy is aimed at strengthening and expanding India's relations with Kazakhstan, Kyrgyzstan, Tajikistan, Turkmenistan, and Uzbekistan. Look East policy was initiated in 1992 by Narasimha Rao to cultivate extensive economic and strategic relations with the nations of Southeast Asia to bolster its standing as a regional power and a counterweight to the strategic influence of the People's Republic of China. The Congress has historically backed the Palestinian cause and a two-state solution, while also recognizing Israel's right to exist. Subsequently, in 1992 Rao decided to bring into open India's relations with Israel, which had been kept covertly active for a few years during his tenure as a Foreign Minister, and permitted Israel to open an embassy in New Delhi. Rao decided to maintain a distance from the Dalai Lama to avoid aggravating Beijing's suspicions and concerns, and made successful overtures to Tehran.

Even though the Congress foreign policy doctrine stands for maintaining friendly relations with all the countries of the world, it has always exhibited a special bias towards the Afro-Asian nations. It played active role in forming Group of 77 (1964, Group of 15 (1990), Indian Ocean Rim Association, and SAARC. Indira Gandhi firmly tied Indian anti-imperialist interests in Africa to those of the Soviet Union. She openly and enthusiastically supported liberation struggles in Africa. In April 2006, New Delhi hosted an India–Africa summit attended by the leaders of 15 African states.

The party opposes arms race and advocates disarmament, both conventional and nuclear. When in power between 2004 and 2014, Congress worked on India's relationship with the United States. Prime Minister Manmohan Singh visited the US in July 2005 to negotiate an India–United States Civil Nuclear Agreement. US president George W. Bush visited India in March 2006; during this visit, a nuclear agreement that would give India access to nuclear fuel and technology in exchange for the IAEA inspection of its civil nuclear reactors was proposed. Over two years of negotiations, followed by approval from the IAEA, the Nuclear Suppliers Group and the United States Congress, the agreement was signed on 10 October 2008. However, it has not signed Nuclear Non-Proliferation Treaty (NPT) and Comprehensive Nuclear-Test-Ban Treaty (CTBT) due to their discriminatory and hegemonistic nature.

Congress' policy has been to cultivate friendly relations with Japan as well as European Union countries including the United Kingdom, France, and Germany. Diplomatic relations with Iran have continued, and negotiations over the Iran-Pakistan-India gas pipeline have taken place. Congress' policy has also been to improve relations with other developing countries, particularly Brazil and South Africa. While in opposition, the leadership of the Indian National Congress backed the Indian government's stance to abstain from UN resolutions regarding the Russo-Ukrainian War. Congress leaders have denounced military actions in Gaza and opposed India's abstentions on certain United Nations resolutions relating to the conflict.

== Structure and composition ==
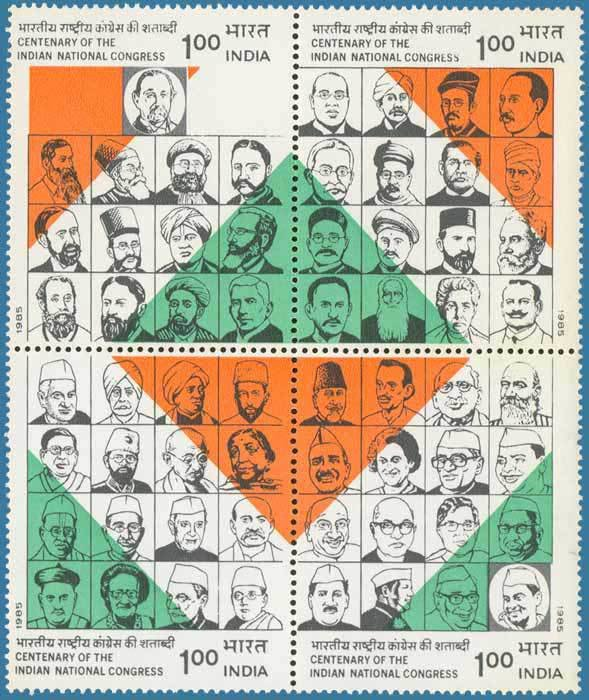
Stamps commemorating centenary of the Congress

At present, the president and the All India Congress Committee (AICC) are elected by delegates from state and district parties at an annual national conference; in every Indian state and union territory—or pradesh—there is a Pradesh Congress Committee (PCC), which is the state-level unit of the party responsible for directing political campaigns at local and state levels, and assisting the campaigns for parliamentary constituencies. Each PCC has a working committee of twenty members, most of whom are appointed by the party president, the leader of the state party, who is chosen by the national president. Those elected as members of the states' legislative assemblies form the Congress Legislature Parties in the various state assemblies; their chairperson is usually the party's nominee for Chief Ministership. The party is also organised into various committees, and sections; it publishes a daily newspaper, the National Herald. Despite being a party with a structure, Congress under Indira Gandhi did not hold any organisational elections after 1972. Nonetheless, in 2004, when the Congress was voted back into power, Manmohan Singh became the first prime minister not to be the president of the party since establishment of the practice of the president holding both positions.

The AICC is composed of delegates sent from the PCCs. The delegates elect Congress committees, including the Congress Working Committee, consisting of senior party leaders and office-bearers. The AICC takes all-important executive and political decisions. Since Indira Gandhi formed Congress (I) in 1978, the President of the Indian National Congress has effectively been the party's national leader, head of the organisation, head of the Working Committee and all chief Congress committees, chief spokesman, and Congress' choice for Prime Minister of India. Constitutionally, the president is elected by the PCCs and members of the AICC; however, this procedure has often been bypassed by the Working Committee, which has elected its candidate.

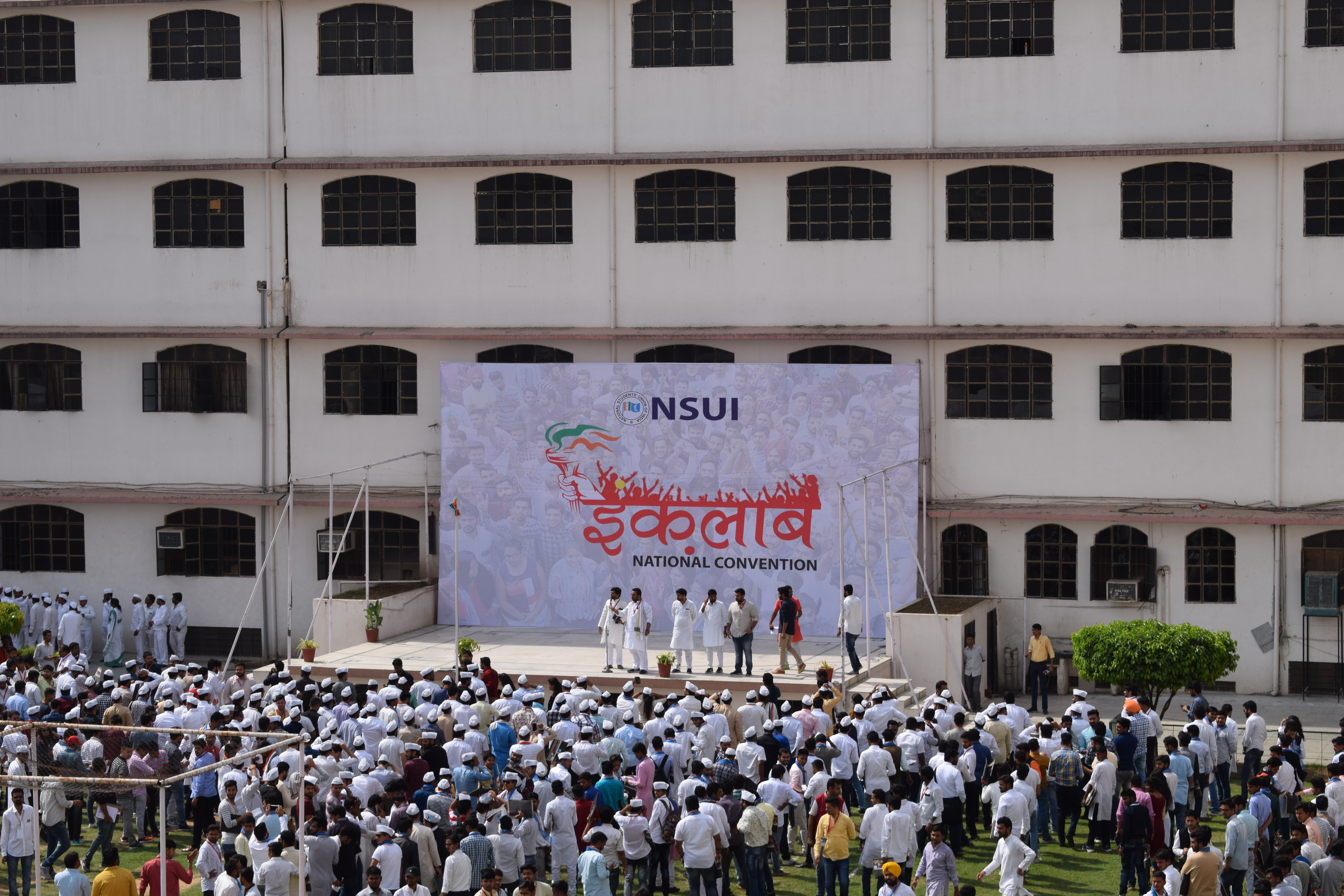
National Students' Union of India (NSUI) National Convention Inquilab-1 in Jaipur

The Congress Parliamentary Party (CPP) consists of elected MPs in the Lok Sabha and Rajya Sabha. There is also a Congress Legislative Party (CLP) leader in each state. The CLP consists of all Congress Members of the Legislative Assembly (MLAs) in each state. In cases of states where the Congress is single-handedly ruling the government, the CLP leader in the chief minister. Other directly affiliated groups include:

- National Students' Union of India (NSUI), the students' wing of the Congress.
- Indian Youth Congress, the party's youth wing.
- Indian National Trade Union Congress, the labour union.
- All India Mahila Congress, its women's division.
- Kisan and Khet Mazdoor Congress, its peasant's wing.
- All India Professionals Congress, its working professionals wing.
- Congress Seva Dal, its voluntary organisation.
- All India Congress Minority Department, also referred to as Minority Congress is the minority wing of the Congress party. It is represented by the Pradesh Congress Minority Department in all the states of India.

=== Election symbols ===
Election symbol of Congress (R) party during the period 1971–1977

As of 2021, the election symbol of Congress, as approved by the Election Commission of India, is an image of a right hand with its palm facing front and its fingers pressed together; this is usually shown in the centre of a tricolor flag. The hand symbol was first used by Indira Gandhi when she split from the Congress (R) faction following the 1977 elections and created the New Congress (I). The hand is symbolic of strength, energy, and unity.

The party under the stewardship of Nehru had the symbol 'Pair of bullocks carrying a yoke' which struck a chord with masses who were predominantly farmers. In 1969, due to internal conflicts within the Congress party, Indira Gandhi decided to break out and form a party of her own, with the majority of the Congress party members in support of her in the new party which was named Congress(R). The symbol of Indira's Congress (R) or Congress (Requisitionists) during the 1971–1977 period was a cow with a suckling calf. After losing the support of 76 out of the party's 153 members in the Lok Sabha, Indira's new political outfit the Congress (I) or Congress (Indira) evolved and she opted for the hand (open palm) symbol.

=== Dynasticism ===
Dynasticism is fairly common in many political parties in India, including the Congress party. Six members of the Nehru–Gandhi family have been presidents of the party. The party started being controlled by Indira Gandhi's family during the emergency with her younger son, Sanjay Gandhi, taking on a prominent role. This was characterised by servility and sycophancy towards the family which later led to a hereditary succession of Rajiv Gandhi as successor after Indira Gandhi's assassination, as well as the party's selection of Sonia Gandhi as Rajiv's successor after his assassination, which she turned down. Since the formation of Congress (I) by Indira Gandhi in 1978 till 2022, the party president has been from her family except for the period between 1991 and 1998. In the last three elections to the Lok Sabha combined, 37 per cent of Congress party MPs had family members precede them in politics. However, in recent times there have been calls from within the party to restructure the organisation. A group of senior leaders wrote a letter to the party president to reform the Congress allowing others to take charge. There was also visible discontent following the loss in the 2019 election after which a group of 23 senior leaders wrote to the Congress President to restructure the party.

== Presence in states and union territories ==
Indian National Congress is the only political party in India, which has experience of running the state government of every Indian states in post-independence Indian history. From the first general election in 1952 when Jawaharlal Nehru led it to a landslide victory, the Congress won in the majority of the following state elections and paved the way for a Nehruvian era of single-party dominance. The party during the post-independence era has governed most of the States and union territories of India. As of May 2026, the INC is in power in the states of Telangana, Himachal Pradesh, Karnataka and Kerala. In Jharkhand, it shares power as a junior ally with Jharkhand Mukti Morcha. In Tamil Nadu its a junior ally of the TVK and in Jammu and Kashmir with JKNC. The Congress has previously been the sole party in power in Delhi, Andhra Pradesh, Meghalaya, Haryana, Uttarakhand and in the Union Territory of Puducherry. Congress has enjoyed overwhelming electoral majority for over decades in Arunachal Pradesh, Delhi, Kerala, Maharashtra and Punjab. It has a regional political alliance in Bihar, which is named Mahagathbandhan, in Tamil Nadu it is the Secular Social Justice Victory Alliance, in Jharkhand, it is also the Mahagathbandhan, in Maharashtra, it is the Maha Vikas Aghadi, and in Kerala, it is the United Democratic Front.

State	Govt Since	Chief Minister						Seats	Alliances	Seats in Assembly
State	Govt Since	Name	Photo	Party	Deputy	Photo	Ministry	Seats	Alliances	Seats in Assembly
INC Government
Himachal Pradesh	8 December 2022	Sukhvinder Singh Sukhu		INC	Mukesh Agnihotri		Sukhu I	40	—N/a	40 / 68
Karnataka	14 May 2023	D. K. Shivakumar		INC	G. Parameshwara		Shivakumar I	138	SKP (1)	140 / 224
Karnataka	14 May 2023	D. K. Shivakumar		INC	G. Parameshwara		Shivakumar I	138	IND (1)	140 / 224
Kerala	18 May 2026	V. D. Satheesan		INC	—N/a		Satheesan I	63	UDF (39)	102 / 140
Telangana	7 December 2023	Revanth Reddy		INC	Mallu Bhatti Vikramarka		Revanth Reddy I	76	CPI (1)	77 / 119
Alliance Government
Jammu and Kashmir	16 October 2024	Omar Abdullah		JKNC	Surinder Choudhary		Omar II	42	INC (6)	52 / 95
Jammu and Kashmir	16 October 2024	Omar Abdullah		JKNC	Surinder Choudhary		Omar II	42	CPI(M) (1)	52 / 95
Jammu and Kashmir	16 October 2024	Omar Abdullah		JKNC	Surinder Choudhary		Omar II	42	IND (3)	52 / 95
Jharkhand	28 November 2024	Hemant Soren		JMM	—N/a		Soren IV	34	INC (16)	56 / 81
Jharkhand	28 November 2024	Hemant Soren		JMM	—N/a		Soren IV	34	RJD (4)	56 / 81
Jharkhand	28 November 2024	Hemant Soren		JMM	—N/a		Soren IV	34	CPI(ML)L (2)	56 / 81
Tamil Nadu	10 May 2026	C. Joseph Vijay		TVK	—N/a		Vijay I	108	INC (5)	121 / 234
Tamil Nadu	10 May 2026	C. Joseph Vijay		TVK	—N/a		Vijay I	108	CPI(M) (2)	121 / 234
Tamil Nadu	10 May 2026	C. Joseph Vijay		TVK	—N/a		Vijay I	108	CPI (2)	121 / 234
Tamil Nadu	10 May 2026	C. Joseph Vijay		TVK	—N/a		Vijay I	108	VCK (2)	121 / 234
Tamil Nadu	10 May 2026	C. Joseph Vijay		TVK	—N/a		Vijay I	108	IUML (2)	121 / 234

=== Legislative Assembly ===
State/UT Assembly	Overall Tally	Legislative Leader	PCC President	Status
Andhra Pradesh Legislative Assembly	No Representation		Y.S. Sharmila	Others
Arunachal Pradesh Legislative Assembly	1 / 60	Kumar Waii	Bosiram Siram	Others
Assam Legislative Assembly	19 / 126	Wazed Choudhury	Gaurav Gogoi	Opposition
Bihar Legislative Assembly	6 / 243	Shakeel Ahmad Khan	Rajesh Kumar	Opposition
Chhattisgarh Legislative Assembly	35 / 90	Charan Das Mahant	Deepak Baij	Opposition
Delhi Legislative Assembly	No Representation		Devender Yadav	Others
Goa Legislative Assembly	3 / 40	Yuri Alemao	Girish Chodankar	Opposition
Gujarat Legislative Assembly	12 / 182	Tushar Chaudhary	Amit Chavda	Opposition
Haryana Legislative Assembly	37 / 90	Bhupinder Singh Hooda	Rao Narendra Singh	Opposition
Himachal Pradesh Legislative Assembly	40 / 68	Sukhvinder Singh Sukhu	Vinay Kumar	Government
Jammu and Kashmir Legislative Assembly	6 / 90	Ghulam Ahmad Mir	Tariq Hameed Karra	Coalition
Jharkhand Legislative Assembly	16 / 81	Pradeep Yadav	Keshav Mahto Kamlesh	Coalition
Karnataka Legislative Assembly	136 / 224	D. K. Shivakumar	B. K. Hariprasad	Government
Kerala Legislative Assembly	63 / 140	V. Damodaran Satheesan	Sunny Joseph	Government
Madhya Pradesh Legislative Assembly	63 / 230	Umang Singhar	Jitu Patwari	Opposition
Maharashtra Legislative Assembly	16 / 288	Vijay Wadettiwar	Harshwardhan Sapkal	Opposition
Manipur Legislative Assembly	5 / 60	Okram Ibobi Singh	Keisham Meghachandra Singh	Opposition
Meghalaya Legislative Assembly	No Representation		Vincent Pala	Others
Mizoram Legislative Assembly	1 / 40	C. Ngunlianchunga	Lal Thanzara	Others
Nagaland Legislative Assembly	No Representation		S. Supongmeren Jamir	Others
Odisha Legislative Assembly	11 / 147	Rama Chandra Kadam	Bhakta Charan Das	Others
Puducherry Legislative Assembly	1 / 30	P. Karthikeyan	V. Vaithilingam	Opposition
Punjab Legislative Assembly	16 / 117	Partap Singh Bajwa	Amrinder Singh Raja Warring	Opposition
Rajasthan Legislative Assembly	67 / 200	Tika Ram	Govind Singh Dotasra	Opposition
Sikkim Legislative Assembly	No Representation		Gopal Chhettri	Others
Tamil Nadu Legislative Assembly	5 / 234	Tharahai Cuthbert	Manickam Tagore	Coalition
Telangana Legislative Assembly	76 / 119	Revanth Reddy	Bomma Mahesh Kumar Goud	Government
Tripura Legislative Assembly	3 / 60	Sudip Roy Barman	Ashish Kumar Saha	Opposition
Uttar Pradesh Legislative Assembly	2 / 403	Aradhana Misra	Ajay Rai	Opposition
Uttarakhand Legislative Assembly	20 / 70	Yashpal Arya	Karan Mahara	Opposition
West Bengal Legislative Assembly	2 / 294	Julfikar Ali	Shubhankar Sarkar	Others

=== Legislative Council ===
State/UT	Overall Tally	Legislative Leader	Status
Andhra Pradesh Legislative Council	No Representation		Others
Bihar Legislative Council	1 / 75	Rajeev Kumar	Opposition
Karnataka Legislative Council	38 / 75	N. S. Boseraju	Government
Maharashtra Legislative Council	4 / 75	Bhai Jagtap	Opposition
Telangana Legislative Council	13 / 40	Bomma Mahesh Kumar Goud	Government
Uttar Pradesh Legislative Council	No Representation		Others

== List of presidents ==
Portrait	Name (Birth–Death)	Home state	Former Office(s)	Term of office			Oath administered by (CJI)	Election	Election Map	Vice President
Portrait	Name (Birth–Death)	Home state	Former Office(s)	Assumed office	Left office	Time in office	Oath administered by (CJI)	Election	Election Map	Vice President
	Rajendra Prasad (1884–1963)	Bihar	Minister of Agriculture	26 January 1950	13 May 1952	12 years, 107 days	H. J. Kania	1950		–
	Rajendra Prasad (1884–1963)	Bihar	Minister of Agriculture	13 May 1952	13 May 1957	12 years, 107 days	M. Patanjali Sastri	1952		Sarvepalli Radhakrishnan
	Rajendra Prasad (1884–1963)	Bihar	Minister of Agriculture	13 May 1957	13 May 1962	12 years, 107 days	Sudhi Ranjan Das	1957		Sarvepalli Radhakrishnan
	Fakhruddin Ali Ahmed (1905–1977)	National Capital Territory of Delhi	Minister of Agriculture	24 August 1974	11 February 1977^{[†]}	2 years, 171 days	A. N. Ray	1974		Gopal Swarup Pathak B. D. Jatti
	B. D. Jatti (1912–2002)	Karnataka	Chief Minister of Karnataka	11 February 1977	25 July 1977	164 days		–	–	
	Zail Singh (1916–1994)	Punjab	Chief Minister of Punjab	25 July 1982	25 July 1987	5 years	Y. V. Chandrachud	1982		Mohammad Hidayatullah Ramaswamy Venkataraman
	Ramaswamy Venkataraman (1910–2009)	Tamil Nadu	Vice President of India Minister of Defence	25 July 1987	25 July 1992	5 years	Raghunandan Swarup Pathak	1987		Shankar Dayal Sharma
	Shankar Dayal Sharma (1918–1999)	Madhya Pradesh	Vice President of India Governor of Maharashtra	25 July 1992	25 July 1997	5 years	M. H. Kania	1992		K. R. Narayanan
	K. R. Narayanan (1920–2005)	Kerala	Vice President of India	25 July 1997	25 July 2002	5 years	J. S. Verma	1997		Krishan Kant
	Pratibha Patil (born 1934)	Maharashtra	Governor of Rajasthan	25 July 2007	25 July 2012	5 years	K. G. Balakrishnan	2007		M. Hamid Ansari
	Pranab Mukherjee (1935–2020)	West Bengal	Minister of Defence Minister of Finance Minister of External Affairs	25 July 2012	25 July 2017	5 years	S. H. Kapadia	2012		M. Hamid Ansari

=== List of vice presidents ===
Portrait	Name (Lifespan)	Home state	Term of office Duration in years and days		Mandate	Prior positions held	President (Tenure)
	B. D. Jatti (1912–2002)	Karnataka	31 August 1974	31 August 1979	1974 (78.7%)	Chief Minister of Mysore State (1958–1962); Lieutenant Governor of Pondicherry (1968–1972); Governor of Orissa (1972–1974)	Fakhruddin Ali Ahmed (24 Aug 1974 – 11 Feb 1977)
	B. D. Jatti (1912–2002)	Karnataka	5 years, 0 days		1974 (78.7%)	Chief Minister of Mysore State (1958–1962); Lieutenant Governor of Pondicherry (1968–1972); Governor of Orissa (1972–1974)	Self (acting) (11 Feb 1977 – 25 Jul 1977)
	B. D. Jatti (1912–2002)	Karnataka	Former chief minister of Mysore and former governor. Elected as the fifth vice president in 1974 defeating his nearest rival Niral Enem Horo. Became Acting President on 11 February 1977 following the demise of president Fakhruddin Ali Ahmed and served in the acting capacity till the election of Neelam Sanjiva Reddy in July 1977. Retired as vice president upon completion of tenure in 1979.				Neelam Sanjiva Reddy (25 Jul 1977 – 25 Jul 1982)
	Ramaswamy Venkataraman (1910–2009)	Tamil Nadu	31 August 1984	24 July 1987^{[RES]}	1984 (71.05%)	Member, Lok Sabha (1952–1957); Minister of Industries, Labour, Co-operation, etc., Madras State (1957–1967); Union Minister of Finance (1980–1982); Union Minister of Home Affairs (1982); Union Minister of Defence (1982–1984)	Giani Zail Singh (25 Jul 1982 – 25 Jul 1987)
	Ramaswamy Venkataraman (1910–2009)	Tamil Nadu	2 years, 327 days		1984 (71.05%)	Member, Lok Sabha (1952–1957); Minister of Industries, Labour, Co-operation, etc., Madras State (1957–1967); Union Minister of Finance (1980–1982); Union Minister of Home Affairs (1982); Union Minister of Defence (1982–1984)	Giani Zail Singh (25 Jul 1982 – 25 Jul 1987)
	Ramaswamy Venkataraman (1910–2009)	Tamil Nadu	Former union minister. Elected as the seventh vice president in 1984 after defeating B. C. Kamble in the vice presidential election. As vice president, he played important role in being deputed for president on making diplomatic visits and acting as a mediator for then prime minister Rajiv Gandhi and president Zail Singh. Resigned from the vice presidency on the eve of assuming office as the President on 25 July 1987.				Giani Zail Singh (25 Jul 1982 – 25 Jul 1987)
	Shankar Dayal Sharma (1918–1999)	Madhya Pradesh	3 September 1987	24 July 1992^{[RES]}	1987 (Unopposed)	Chief Minister of Bhopal State (1952–1956); National President, Indian National Congress (1972–1974); Union Minister of Communications (1974–1977); Governor of Andhra Pradesh (1984–1985), Punjab (1985), and Maharashtra (1985–1987)	Ramaswamy Venkataraman (25 Jul 1987 – 25 Jul 1992)
	Shankar Dayal Sharma (1918–1999)	Madhya Pradesh	4 years, 325 days		1987 (Unopposed)	Chief Minister of Bhopal State (1952–1956); National President, Indian National Congress (1972–1974); Union Minister of Communications (1974–1977); Governor of Andhra Pradesh (1984–1985), Punjab (1985), and Maharashtra (1985–1987)	Ramaswamy Venkataraman (25 Jul 1987 – 25 Jul 1992)
	Shankar Dayal Sharma (1918–1999)	Madhya Pradesh	Former union minister. Elected unopposed as the eighth vice president in 1987 to fill the vacancy caused by the election of then vice president Ramasamy Venkataraman as the President. He resigned as the vice president in 1992 after being elected as the President.				Ramaswamy Venkataraman (25 Jul 1987 – 25 Jul 1992)
	K. R. Narayanan (1920–2005)	Kerala	21 August 1992	24 July 1997^{[RES]}	1992 (99.86%)	Ambassador of Thailand (1967–1969) and Turkey (1973–1975); Secretary (East), Ministry of External Affairs (1975–1976); Ambassador to China (1976–1978) and the United States (1980–1984); Member, Lok Sabha (1984–1992); Union Minister of State, Planning (1985), External Affairs (1985–1986), Science and Technology (1986–1989)	Shankar Dayal Sharma (25 Jul 1992 – 25 Jul 1997)
	K. R. Narayanan (1920–2005)	Kerala	4 years, 337 days		1992 (99.86%)	Ambassador of Thailand (1967–1969) and Turkey (1973–1975); Secretary (East), Ministry of External Affairs (1975–1976); Ambassador to China (1976–1978) and the United States (1980–1984); Member, Lok Sabha (1984–1992); Union Minister of State, Planning (1985), External Affairs (1985–1986), Science and Technology (1986–1989)	Shankar Dayal Sharma (25 Jul 1992 – 25 Jul 1997)
	K. R. Narayanan (1920–2005)	Kerala	Former diplomat and former union minister. Elected as the ninth vice president in 1992 defeating his rival candidate Joginder Singh. First Dalit vice president of India. Resigned from the vice presidency in 1997 after being elected as the President.				Shankar Dayal Sharma (25 Jul 1992 – 25 Jul 1997)
	Mohammad Hamid Ansari (born 1937)	West Bengal	11 August 2007	11 August 2012	2007 (60.50%)	Ambassador to the United Arab Emirates (1976–1980); High Commissioner to Australia (1985–1989); Ambassador to Afghanistan (1989–1990), Iran (1990–1992), Saudi Arabia (1995–1999); Permanent Representative to the United Nations (1993–1995); Vice-Chancellor, Aligarh Muslim University (2000–2002); Chairman, National Commission for Minorities (2006–2007)	Pratibha Patil (25 Jul 2007 – 25 Jul 2012)
	Mohammad Hamid Ansari (born 1937)	West Bengal	11 August 2007	11 August 2012	2007 (60.50%)	Ambassador to the United Arab Emirates (1976–1980); High Commissioner to Australia (1985–1989); Ambassador to Afghanistan (1989–1990), Iran (1990–1992), Saudi Arabia (1995–1999); Permanent Representative to the United Nations (1993–1995); Vice-Chancellor, Aligarh Muslim University (2000–2002); Chairman, National Commission for Minorities (2006–2007)	Pranab Mukherjee (25 Jul 2012 – 25 Jul 2017)
	Mohammad Hamid Ansari (born 1937)	West Bengal	11 August 2012	11 August 2017	2012 (67.31%)	Ambassador to the United Arab Emirates (1976–1980); High Commissioner to Australia (1985–1989); Ambassador to Afghanistan (1989–1990), Iran (1990–1992), Saudi Arabia (1995–1999); Permanent Representative to the United Nations (1993–1995); Vice-Chancellor, Aligarh Muslim University (2000–2002); Chairman, National Commission for Minorities (2006–2007)	Pranab Mukherjee (25 Jul 2012 – 25 Jul 2017)
	Mohammad Hamid Ansari (born 1937)	West Bengal	11 August 2012	11 August 2017	2012 (67.31%)	Ambassador to the United Arab Emirates (1976–1980); High Commissioner to Australia (1985–1989); Ambassador to Afghanistan (1989–1990), Iran (1990–1992), Saudi Arabia (1995–1999); Permanent Representative to the United Nations (1993–1995); Vice-Chancellor, Aligarh Muslim University (2000–2002); Chairman, National Commission for Minorities (2006–2007)	Ram Nath Kovind (25 Jul 2017 – 25 Jul 2022)
	Mohammad Hamid Ansari (born 1937)	West Bengal	10 years, 0 days		2012 (67.31%)	Ambassador to the United Arab Emirates (1976–1980); High Commissioner to Australia (1985–1989); Ambassador to Afghanistan (1989–1990), Iran (1990–1992), Saudi Arabia (1995–1999); Permanent Representative to the United Nations (1993–1995); Vice-Chancellor, Aligarh Muslim University (2000–2002); Chairman, National Commission for Minorities (2006–2007)	Ram Nath Kovind (25 Jul 2017 – 25 Jul 2022)
	Mohammad Hamid Ansari (born 1937)	West Bengal	Former diplomat. Elected as the twelfth vice president in 2007. Re-elected to office for a second term in 2012 by defeating his rival candidate Jaswant Singh. First and only vice president since Sarvepalli Radhakrishnan to be re-elected to office and the longest-serving vice president. Retired from office upon completion of tenure on 11 August 2017, becoming the first vice president to serve under three presidents.				Ram Nath Kovind (25 Jul 2017 – 25 Jul 2022)

== Legislative leaders ==
The Congress party has played a pivotal role in shaping India's political landscape, with prominent leaders such as Jawaharlal Nehru, Indira Gandhi, and Manmohan Singh as serving the country's longest-serving prime ministers and contributing significantly to the nation's development. Gulzarilal Nanda took office in 1966 following the death of Lal Bahadur Shastri for 13 days as the acting Prime Minister of India. His earlier 13-day stint as the second Prime Minister of India followed the death of Prime Minister Jawaharlal Nehru in 1964. Indira Gandhi, the first and so far the only woman Prime Minister of India, served the second-longest term as a prime minister. Rajiv Gandhi served from 1984 to 1989, taking office on the day of the assassination of Indira Gandhi in 1984. At age 40, he was the youngest PM of India and was known for economic reforms during his tenure. PV Narasimha Rao served as the 10th Prime Minister of India and was the first PM from southern India. Manmohan Singh served two complete terms as Prime Minister and headed the coalition governments twice.

=== List of prime ministers ===
Prime ministers	Portrait	Term of office Duration in years and days			Government	Lok Sabha	Constituency	Head of State
Prime ministers	Portrait	Start	End	Tenure	Government	Lok Sabha	Constituency	Head of State
Jawaharlal Nehru (1889–1964)		15 August 1947	15 April 1952	16 years, 286 days	Nehru I	Constituent Assembly		
Jawaharlal Nehru (1889–1964)		15 April 1952	4 April 1957	16 years, 286 days	Nehru II	1st	Phulpur	Rajendra Prasad
Jawaharlal Nehru (1889–1964)		17 April 1957	2 April 1962	16 years, 286 days	Nehru III	2nd	Phulpur	Rajendra Prasad
Jawaharlal Nehru (1889–1964)		2 April 1962	27 May 1964	16 years, 286 days	Nehru IV	3rd	Phulpur	Sarvepalli Radhakrishnan
Gulzarilal Nanda (1898–1998)		27 May 1964	9 June 1964	26 days	Nanda I	3rd	Sabarkantha	Sarvepalli Radhakrishnan
Gulzarilal Nanda (1898–1998)		11 January 1966	24 January 1966	26 days	Nanda II	3rd	Sabarkantha	Sarvepalli Radhakrishnan
Lal Bahadur Shastri (1904–1966)		9 June 1964	11 January 1966	1 year, 216 days	Shastri	3rd	Allahabad	Sarvepalli Radhakrishnan
Indira Gandhi (1917–1984)		24 January 1966	13 March 1967	15 years, 350 days	Indira I	3rd	Rajya Sabha MP from Uttar Pradesh	Sarvepalli Radhakrishnan
Indira Gandhi (1917–1984)		13 March 1967	18 March 1971	15 years, 350 days	Indira II	4th	Rae Bareli	Zakir Husain; V. V. Giri; Mohammad Hidayatullah; Fakhruddin Ali Ahmed; B. D. Jatti; Neelam Sanjiva Reddy; Zail Singh
Indira Gandhi (1917–1984)		18 March 1971	24 March 1977	15 years, 350 days	Indira III	5th	Rae Bareli	Zakir Husain; V. V. Giri; Mohammad Hidayatullah; Fakhruddin Ali Ahmed; B. D. Jatti; Neelam Sanjiva Reddy; Zail Singh
Indira Gandhi (1917–1984)		14 January 1980	31 October 1984	15 years, 350 days	Indira IV	7th	Medak	Zakir Husain; V. V. Giri; Mohammad Hidayatullah; Fakhruddin Ali Ahmed; B. D. Jatti; Neelam Sanjiva Reddy; Zail Singh
Rajiv Gandhi (1944–1991)		31 October 1984	31 December 1984	5 years, 32 days	Rajiv I	7th	Amethi	Ramaswamy Venkataraman
Rajiv Gandhi (1944–1991)		31 December 1984	2 December 1989	5 years, 32 days	Rajiv II	8th	Amethi	Ramaswamy Venkataraman
P. V. Narasimha Rao (1921–2004)		21 June 1991	16 May 1996	4 years, 330 days	Rao	10th	Nandyal	Shankar Dayal Sharma
Manmohan Singh (1932–2024)		22 May 2004	26 May 2009	10 years, 4 days	Singh I	14th	Rajya Sabha MP from Assam	A. P. J. Abdul Kalam; Pratibha Patil; Pranab Mukherjee
Manmohan Singh (1932–2024)		22 May 2009	26 May 2014	10 years, 4 days	Singh II	15th	Rajya Sabha MP from Assam	A. P. J. Abdul Kalam; Pratibha Patil; Pranab Mukherjee

=== List of deputy prime ministers ===
Portrait	Name (Birth–Death)	Term in office			Lok Sabha (Election)	Constituency (House)	Prime Minister	Head of State
Portrait	Name (Birth–Death)	Assumed office	Left office	Time in office	Lok Sabha (Election)	Constituency (House)	Prime Minister	Head of State
	Vallabhbhai Patel (1875–1950)	15 August 1947	15 December 1950 (death)	3 years, 122 days	Constituent Assembly	N/A	Jawaharlal Nehru	none
	Morarji Desai (1896–1995)	13 March 1967	19 July 1969	2 years, 128 days	4th (1967)	Surat (Lok Sabha)	Indira Gandhi	Zakir Husain

== See also ==
- All India Congress Committee
- Congress Working Committee
- Electoral history of the Indian National Congress
- High command culture
- Indian National Developmental Inclusive Alliance
- List of chief ministers from the Indian National Congress
- List of Indian National Congress breakaway parties
- List of political parties in India
- List of presidents of the Indian National Congress
- List of state presidents of the Indian National Congress
- Nehru–Gandhi family
- Politics of India
- Pradesh Congress Committee
- United Progressive Alliance

== Bibliography ==
- Choudhary, Sunil K. (31 August 2017). "Mapaivot vs Congress System". The Changing Face of Parties and Party Systems. Singapore: Palgrave Macmillan. pp. 59–84. doi:10.1007/978-981-10-5175-3_5. ISBN 978-981-10-5175-3.
- Hewitt, Vernon (1989). "The Congress System is Dead: Long Live the Party System and Democratic India?". Commonwealth & Comparative Politics. 27 (2): 157–171. doi:10.1080/14662048908447564. ISSN 1466-2043.
- Kothari, Rajni (December 1964). "The Congress 'System' in India" (PDF). Asian Survey. 4 (12): 1161–1173. doi:10.2307/2642550. ISSN 0004-4687. JSTOR 2642550.
- Kothari, Rajni (February 1967). "India: The Congress System on Trial". Asian Survey. 7 (2): 83–96. doi:10.2307/2642519. ISSN 0004-4687. JSTOR 2642519.
- Kothari, Rajni (December 1974). "The Congress System Revisited: A Decennial Review". Asian Survey. 14 (12): 1035–1054. doi:10.2307/2643198. ISSN 0004-4687. JSTOR 2643198.
- Kumar, Rajesh (18 September 2023). "The Congress Party and the Indian Party System". Indian Politics and Political Processes. New Delhi: Routledge. pp. 237–258. ISBN 9781003434443.
- Sarangi, Prakash (September 1979). "Internal Challenge to the 'Congress System': The Case of the Utkal Congress". The Indian Journal of Political Science. 40 (3): 433–425. ISSN 0019-5510. JSTOR 41854972.
- Singh, Mahendra Prasad (1981). Split in a Predominant Party: The Indian National Congress in 1969. Abhinav Publications. ISBN 978-81-7017-140-9.
