= Gurdeep Singh =

Gurdeep or Gurdip Singh may refer to:

- Gurdeep Singh (cricketer) (born 1998), Kenyan cricketer
- Gurdeep Singh (NTPC), Indian businessman
- Gurdeep Singh (Pakistani politician), Pakistani politician
- Gurdeep Singh (weightlifter), Indian weightlifter
- Ponty Chadha (Gurdeep Singh Chadha), Indian businessman
- Gurdeep Singh Sappal, Indian politician
- Gurdeep Singh Shahpini, Indian politician
- Gurdip Singh, Indian university vice chancellor
- Gurdip Singh (professor), Indian Ayurvedic professor
