= Indian National Congress campaign for the 2024 Indian general election =

INC Campaign for 2024 Indian lower house election

- Campaign: 2024 Indian general election
- Affiliation: Indian National Congress
- Alliance: Indian National Developmental Inclusive Alliance
- Key people: Mallikarjun Kharge (Party President); Sonia Gandhi (CPP Chairperson); Rahul Gandhi; Priyanka Gandhi
- Slogan: "Judega Bharat, Jeetega India"; India will unite, India will win "Nyay Ka Haq Milne Tak"; Until we get our right to justice "Haath Badlega Halaat"; The Hand will change the situation "Mere Vikaas ka do Hisaab"; Give accounts of my development
- Issue: Unemployment Democratic backsliding Manipur riots Electoral bonds controversy Adani Group issue Farmers' protest
- Website: www.inc.in

The Indian National Congress is known as the Grand Old Party of India. The party had ruled India for most of its post independence period for nearly 54 years. The party led coalition United Progressive Alliance is in opposition bench in 16th Lok Sabha and 17th Lok Sabha against the National Democratic Alliance. The party contestested the elections unsuccessfully with the promise of upholding Nyay (justice), secularism, federalism, pluralism, democracy and constitutionalism.

== Prelude ==
- 24 May 2022 - Indian National Congress President Sonia Gandhi constituted the Political Affairs Group, Task Force-2024 and Central Planning Group which will be presided over by her, for the upcoming 2024 Indian general election.
- 7 Sept 2022 - Bharat Jodo Yatra by Rahul Gandhi commenced at Kanyakumari.
- 19 Oct 2022 - Mallikarjun Kharge elected as the president of Indian National Congress in a democratic election conducted among 9900 party workers.
- 30 Jan 2023 - Bharat Jodo Yatra ends at Srinagar after traversing nearly 4000 km.
- 24 Mar 2023 - Disqualification of Rahul Gandhi.
- 13 May 2023 - Indian National Congress registers a thumping victory against Bharatiya Janata Party in 2023 Karnataka Legislative Assembly election.
- 18 July 2023 - Indian National Developmental Inclusive Alliance announced formally in Bangalore.
- 7 Aug 2023 - Rahul Gandhi reinstated as Member of Parliament, Lok Sabha following Supreme Court of India staying conviction against him by Surat court.
- 20 Aug 2023 - Mallikarjun Kharge reconstitutes Congress Working Committee.
- 3 Dec 2023 - Congress suffers defeats in the Hindi heartland states of Madhya Pradesh, Rajasthan and Chhattisgarh. It wins the elections in Telangana.
- 27 Dec 2023 - Rahul Gandhi begins the Bharat Jodo Nyay Yatra from Manipur.
- 16 Mar 2024 - Rahul Gandhi ends the Bharat Jodo Nyay Yatra from Mumbai with the INDIA Alliance party leaders.
- 05 Apr 2024 - The party released its full manifesto titled "Nyay Patra" .

== Campaign ==
The Congress campaign was launched from Nagpur at a huge rally in which over 1 million people were expected to attend in Nagpur, Maharashtra on 28 December 2023. This rally also marked the 138th Congress Foundation Day and was being held to energise the party cadre for the 2024 Indian general election. Party workers from all over the state were called to join the rally.

The Indian National Developmental Inclusive Alliance jointly held a rally at Shivaji Park in Mumbai on 17 March, a day after the end of Rahul Gandhi's Bharat Jodo Nyay Yatra. The rally was attended by Gandhi, SS(UBT) president Uddhav Thackeray, NCP(SP) leader Sharad Pawar, RJD leader Tejashwi Yadav, and DMK leader and Tamil Nadu chief minister M. K. Stalin, among many others. At the rally, Gandhi said that he was compelled to launch his yatra due to rising inflation and unemployment in the nation.

=== Caste census and Reservation ===
Rahul Gandhi has promised to conduct a nationwide caste census and remove the 50% cap on reservation if his party is elected to power. The 50% cap on reservation refers to the maximum amount of government jobs and educational seats that can be reserved for members of lower castes.

=== Bharat Jodo Nyay Yatra ===
On 27 December 2023, the Congress Party announced its sequel to the Bharat Jodo Yatra, known as Bharat Nyay Yatra, later renamed to Bharat Jodo Nyay Yatra ("India Justice and Unity March"). The march started on 14 January 2024 from Manipur and end on 20 March in Mumbai. It covered 6,700 kilometres across 15 states. Unlike the Bharat Jodo Yatra, which focused on campaigning against communalism and divisive politics, the Nyay Yatra focused on livelihood issues such as inflation and unemployment. Like the Bharat Jodo Yatra, the Bharat Jodo Nyay Yatra was also led by Rahul Gandhi.

=== Crowdfunding ===
The Congress started a crowdfunding campaign known as Donate for Desh (Donate for [the] Country) ahead of the general elections. It formally launched the campaign's digital version on 18 December 2023 at a dedicated website (https://donateinc.net). It claimed to be inspired from Mahatma Gandhi's Tilak Swaraj Fund (1920–21). The physical version of the campaign, which be done via door-to-door collection drives, will be launched on 28 December.

The campaign received ₹1.45 crore (US$175,000) on its first day, with the top 5 states in amount of donations being Maharashtra, Rajasthan, Uttar Pradesh, Delhi, and Karnataka.

By the end of 2023, the campaign received around ₹9 crore (US$1.08 million), with 30% of the funds being collected from Telangana and Maharashtra alone.

The campaign had collected about ₹20 crore (US$2.4 million) according to the party when on 28 January, it rebranded its crowdfunding campaign to Donate for Nyay (Donate for Justice), in line with Rahul Gandhi's ongoing Bharat Jodo Nyay Yatra. The ensuing crowdfunding campaign collected 4 crores in 4 days.

== Manifesto ==
The Congress released their groups specific manifesto promises for the general election in the month of March. The manifesto focuses on five major segments of population and promises for them:

- Youth Manifesto: formal employment for a year to under 25 graduate students, filling of 30 lakh government job vacancies, transparency in government job recruitment, ₹5,000 crore (US$605,000) fund for startups, standardisation of the government recruitment exam process, and social security for gig workers.
- Women Manifesto: ₹1 lakh in financial assistance to women from poor families, 50% of new government job recruitments to women, double central government's contribution to the salary of anganwadi, ASHA, and midday meal workers, legal assistance in every panchayat, and at least one hostel for working women in district headquarters.
- Farmers Manifesto: legal guarantee on MSP for farmers, waiving off of farmers' loans, an import-export policy favourable to them, removal of GST from agricultural commodities, and payments directly into farmers' bank accounts within 30 days in case of crop loss.
- Labourers Manifesto: Universal healthcare coverage for workers, increasing national minimum wage to ₹400 (US$4.8) per day from the current ₹172 (US$2.1) per day, an urban employment guarantee law similar to MGNREGA in the rural areas, life and accident insurance for informal sector workers.
- Caste census: The Congress party declared that, if it wins the election, it will conduct a comprehensive census called to survey the population, socio-economic conditions, and representation in governance institutions. It also promised to bring in legislation to eliminate the 50% cap on reservations for SC, ST, and backward classes and to protect tribal forest rights.
- Wealth re-distribution: Rahul Gandhi made a pledge to "redistribute wealth." According to him, poverty and socioeconomic inequality would vanish. Gandhi declared that his party would carry out an institutional and financial census to determine the country's wealthiest citizens if the Congress (together with the allied parties) achieved power. He added that the Congress Party would then use data from the caste census to allocate wealth to the underprivileged castes and "minorities" proportional to their population.

The complete manifesto titled Nyay Patra (Hindi: न्याय पत्र, lit. 'Justice Paper') was released on 5th April 2024. Some salient points in the manifesto are (apart from above promises released earlier) :

- After wide consultations, the manifesto promises to bring a law to recognize civil unions between couples belonging to the LGBTQIA+ community.
- The manifesto promises to implement the Rajasthan Model of cashless insurance up to 25 lakhs for universal healthcare.
- The manifesto promised to waive off student education loans as a one-time measure outstanding as on 15 March 2024.
- The manifesto promised that one day in a week will be devoted to discuss the agenda suggested by the opposition benches in each House of Parliament.
- The manifest promised not to interfere with personal choices of food and dress, to love and marry, and to travel and reside in any part of India. All laws and rules that interfere unreasonably with personal freedoms will be repealed.
- The manifesto promised to de-criminalise the offence of defamation and provide, by law, a speedy remedy by way of civil damages.
- The manifesto rejected the 'One Nation One Election' idea.
- The manifesto promised to establish National Judicial Commission (NJC). The NJC will be responsible for the selection and appointment of judges of the High Courts and the Supreme Court.
- The manifesto promised to amend the Constitution to create two divisions in the Supreme Court: a Constitutional Court and a Court of Appeal. The Constitutional Court consisting of the seven seniormost judges will hear and decide cases involving the interpretation of the Constitution and other cases of legal significance or national importance. The Court of Appeal will be the final court of appeal that will, sitting in Benches of three judges each, hear appeals from the High Court and National Tribunals.
- The manifesto promised to eliminate the “Angel tax” and all other exploitative tax schemes that inhibit investment in new micro, small companies and innovative start-ups.

== Committees ==
=== Task Force 2024 ===
1. P. Chidambaram
2. Mukul Wasnik
3. Jairam Ramesh
4. K. C. Venugopal
5. Ajay Maken
6. Priyanka Gandhi
7. Randeep Surjewala
8. Sunil Kanugolu
9. Aryan Abhay Verma

=== National Alliance Committee ===
1. Ashok Gehlot - Member
2. Bhupesh Baghel - Member
3. Mukul Wasnik - Convenor
4. Salman Khurshid - Member
5. Mohan Prakash - Member

=== Manifesto Committee ===
1. P. Chidambaram - Chairman
2. T. S. Singh Deo - Convenor
3. Siddaramaiah - Member
4. Priyanka Gandhi - Member
5. Anand Sharma - Member
6. Jairam Ramesh - Member
7. Shashi Tharoor - Member
8. Gaikhangam - Member
9. Gaurav Gogoi - Member
10. Praveen Chakravarty - Member
11. Imran Pratapgarhi - Member
12. K. Raju - Member
13. Omkar Singh Markam - Member
14. Ranjeet Ranjan - Member
15. Jignesh Mevani - Member
16. Gurdeep Singh Sappal - Member
17. Amitabh Dubey - Member

=== Publicity Committee ===
1. Ajay Maken, Treasurer AICC - Convenor
2. K. C. Venugopal, General Secretary Organisation AICC
3. Jairam Ramesh, General Secretary Communication AICC
4. Gurdeep Singh Sappal, Incharge Administration AICC
5. Pawan Khera, Chairperson Media and Publicity Department AICC
6. Supriya Shrinate, Chairperson Social Media Department AICC
7. Special Invitee (as required, to be included after their respective approval)

=== Central War Room ===
Organisational War-Room

1. Sasikanth Senthil S. - Chairman
2. Gokul Butail - Vice Chairman
3. Naveen Sharma - Vice Chairman
4. Varun Santosh - Vice Chairman
5. Arvind Kumar - Vice Chairman

Communication War-Room

1. Vaibhav Walia - Chairman

== See also ==
- 2024 Indian general election
- Rahul Gandhi
- Mallikarjun Kharge
