= Bharat Jodo Nyay Yatra =

2024 Indian political movement

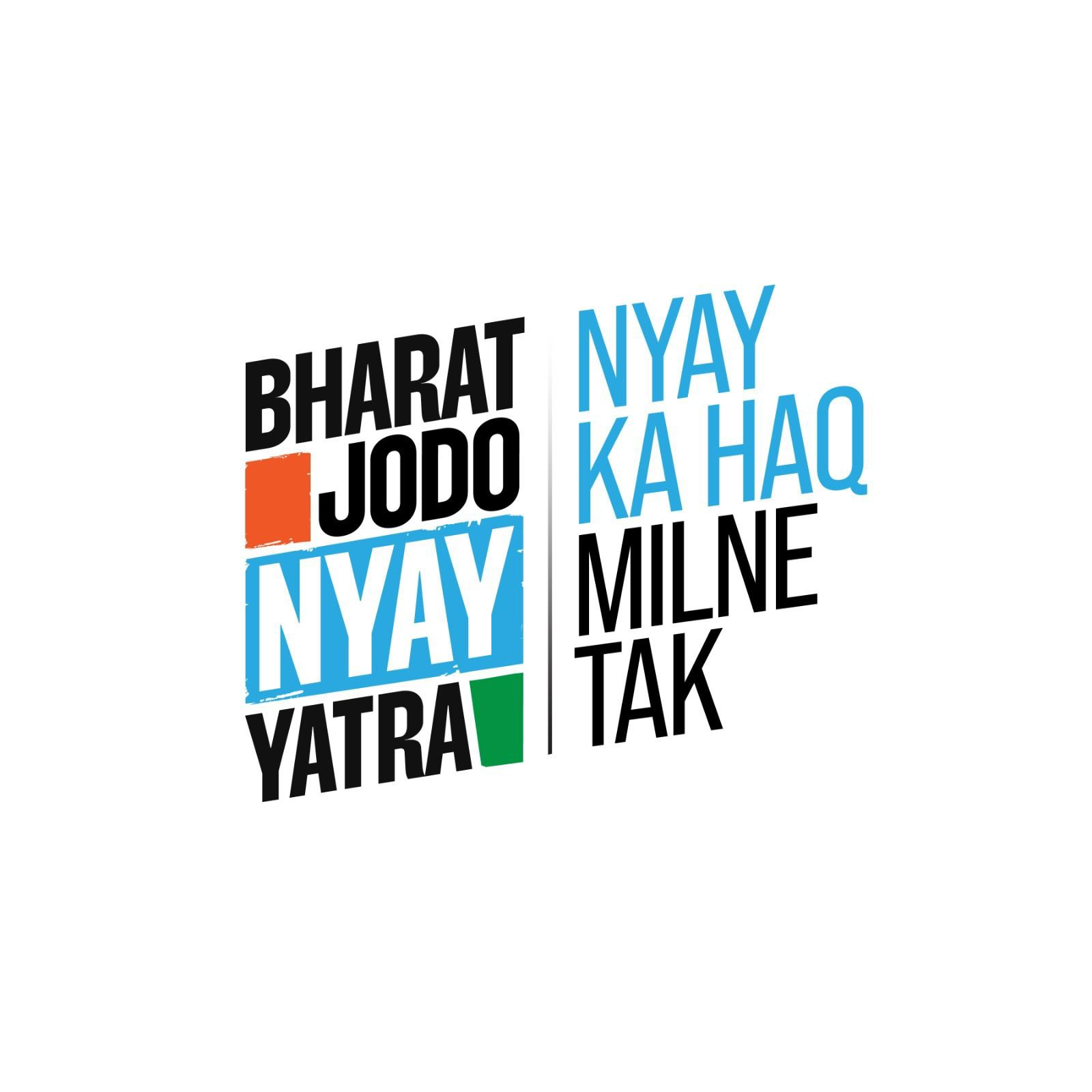
- Date: 14 January 2024 – 16 March 2024
- Duration: 62 days
- Location: India
- Also known as: Nyay Yatra
- Type: Political demonstration, protest
- Theme: Political movement, social movement
- Cause: Economic problems and social disharmony
- Motive: To fight against injustices such as unemployment, inflation, the rich-poor divide and issues related to farmers.
- Organized by: Indian National Congress, Rahul Gandhi
- Participants: Politicians, citizens, civil society organisations, political activists
- Website: bharatjodonyayyatra.com

Bharat Jodo Nyay Yatra (lit. 'Uniting India for Justice March'), commonly referred to as the Nyay Yatra (lit. 'Justice March') was a movement led by the Indian National Congress leader Rahul Gandhi, starting on 14 January 2024 from Thoubal in Manipur and ended on 16 March 2024 in Mumbai spanning east-west of India. The campaign was aimed to increase the party's electoral engagement across the breadth of the country and is seen as a strategy for the upcoming national elections. This political tour was a sequel to the Bharat Jodo Yatra. Unlike the last time though, the Yatra was not done entirely on foot and instead was done in hybrid mode. For the longer parts of the journey, the party used buses. The change was due to time constraint imposed by the upcoming general election.

The Congress Party had said that the initial Bharat Jodo Yatra brought attention to economic disparity, societal division, and an autocratic approach to governance. In contrast, the upcoming Bharat Jodo Nyay Yatra would prioritize the pursuit of social, economic, and political justice for the nation's citizens.

The slogan (tagline) of the Bharat Jodo Nyay Yatra was Nyay Ka Haq Milne Tak ("Until we get our right to justice").

== Plan ==
The course of action was announced on 27 December 2023 by Congress MP and party general secretary (organisation) K. C. Venugopal after Congress Working Committee's deliberation on 21 December 2023. This campaign will have Rahul Gandhi utilizing a bus for transportation, while also engaging in short walks for certain distances which would cover 14 states and 85 districts. Congress president Mallikarjun Kharge will inaugurate this political campaign, aiming to encompass a significant number of states that were previously not included in the Bharat Jodo Yatra conducted earlier. The 66-day-long journey will span a distance of 6,200 kilometers, passing through Manipur, Nagaland, Assam, Meghalaya, West Bengal, Bihar, Jharkhand, Odisha, Chhattisgarh, Uttar Pradesh, Madhya Pradesh, Rajasthan and Gujarat before finally concluding in Maharashtra.

In total, the Bharat Jodo Nyay Yatra aims to encompass 355 Lok Sabha seats across 6,713 kilometres (4,171 miles) which accounts for approximately 65% of the entire parliamentary seats in the nation. During the 2019 Lok Sabha elections, the BJP emerged victorious in 236 out of these 355 seats, while the Congress party secured a mere 14 seats. The Bharat Nyay Yatra was rechristened as the Bharat Jodo Nyay Yatra, with regard to the previous Bharat Jodo Yatra. The Congress initially had planned the march from Arunachal's Pasighat to Porbandar in Gujarat, the birthplace of Mahatma Gandhi, but the ethnic violence in Manipur since May prompted it to change its plan.

== Aim ==
The Congress party explained the reason behind selecting Manipur as the initial destination for the yatra, stating that the objective of this campaign is to initiate the process of "mending the wounds" of the inhabitants of the northeastern state. They had recently experienced a severe bout of ethnic clashes between the Kuki and Meitei communities, which led to a staggering death toll of over 200 individuals and left approximately 60,000 individuals displaced from their homes.

The Congress party plans to emphasise and promote social justice on this Yatra, which will travel through the Hindi dominated states including Bihar, Uttar Pradesh, Madhya Pradesh and Rajasthan. This is set to be achieved by addressing the issue of caste census and advocating for the Other Backward Classes (OBCs) to receive their fair and equitable share in the country's development. By prioritizing social justice, the Congress party may also aim to construct an alternative narrative to counter the Bharatiya Janata Party's intentions of capitalizing on the inauguration of the Ram Mandir in Ayodhya on January 22, 2024.

The matter of unemployment and inflation will hold significant importance in this electoral campaign. These two factors were highlighted by Rahul Gandhi as the primary causes for the two young individuals trespassing the Parliament security and leaping into the Lok Sabha chamber from the visitors' gallery.

Leaders of the Congress-led Indian National Developmental Inclusive Alliance are expected to support this national campaign when Rahul Gandhi reaches out to them in their own constituency.

More than one leader had made headlines last year due to the exertion they faced, allegedly not being able to keep up with Rahul Gandhi.

== Schedule ==
All India - Tentative Yatra Schedule
State	Entry Date	Distance Covered (km)	No. of days (Note: Tentative figures)	Districts Covered	Key places
Manipur	14 January	107	1	4	Thoubal, Imphal
Nagaland	15 January	257	2	5	Kohima
Assam	18 January	833	8	17	Jorhat, Dispur, Guwahati
Arunachal Pradesh	20 January	55	1	1	Itanagar
Meghalaya	22 January	5	1	1	Shillong
West Bengal	25 January	523	5	7	Cooch Behar, Siliguri, Murshidabad
Bihar	28 January	425	4	7	Kishanganj, Araria, Purnia, Sasaram
Jharkhand	2 February	804	8	13	Dhanbad, Ranchi, Jamshedpur
Odisha	7 February	341	4	4	Jharsuguda
Chhattisgarh	8 February	536	5	6	Raigarh, Ambikapur, Korba, Janjgir
Uttar Pradesh	16 February	1,074	11	20	Varanasi, Prayagraj, Amethi, Raebareli, Lucknow, Bareilly, Aligarh, Agra
Madhya Pradesh	2 March	698	7	9	Guna, Ujjain
Rajasthan	26 February	128	1	2	Dholpur, Banswara
Gujarat	7 March	445	5	7	Dahod, Mandvi
Maharashtra	12 March	479	5	6	Malegaon, Nashik, Thane, Mumbai
Total		6,713	66	109	

=== Timeline ===
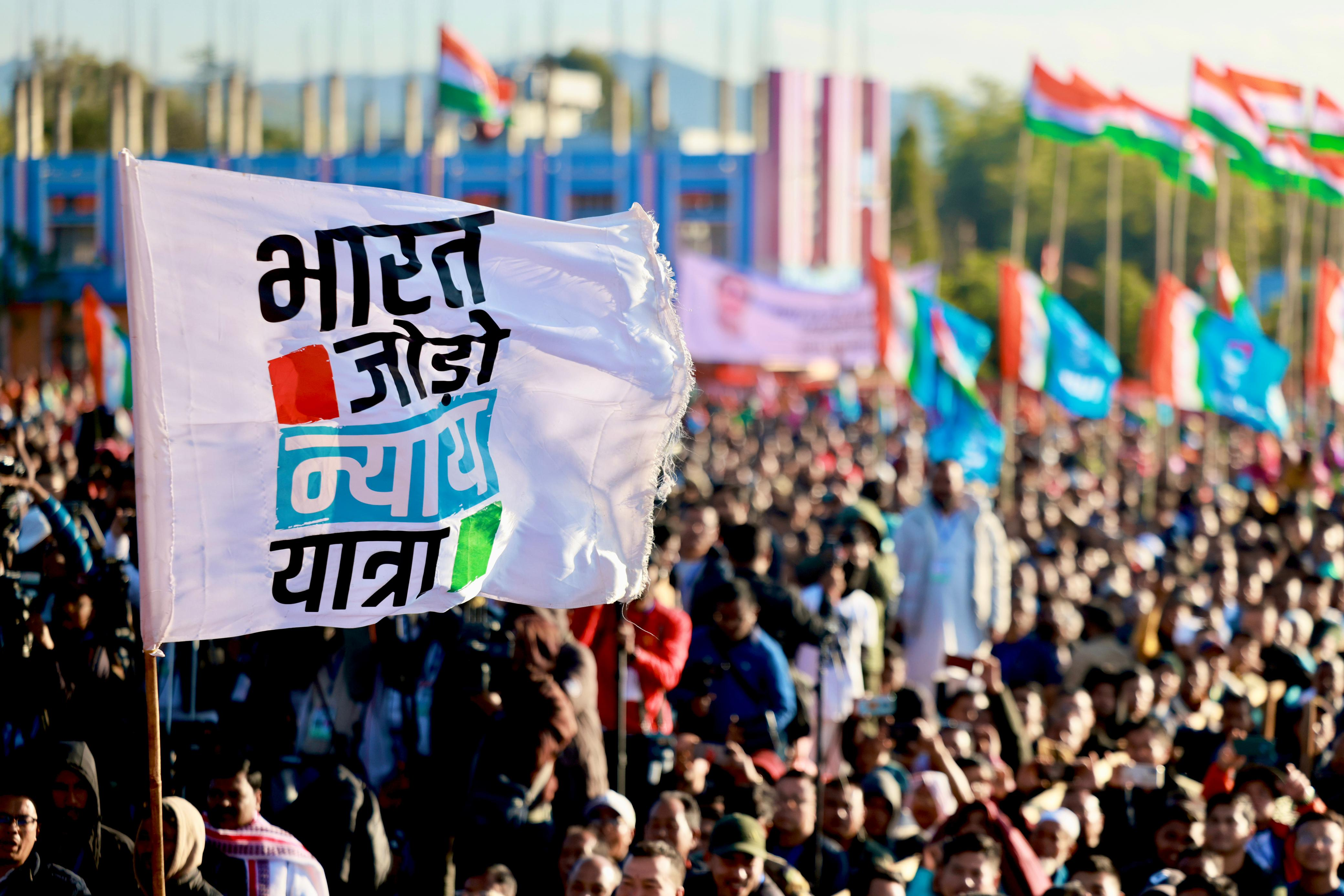
Attendees proudly display banners at the gathering

==== Week 1 (14-20 January) ====
Congress leader Rahul Gandhi flagged off the Bharat Jodo Nyay Yatra at Thoubal in Manipur state. Addressing a meeting at the launch, he attacked the BJP over its handling of the Manipur crisis and said that the crisis was a result of the BJP's ideology and hatred. Party president Kharge criticised prime minister Modi, whom he accused of using the Ram temple inauguration for electoral gains. The yatra entered Nagaland the following day. On 17 January, at Mokokchung, Gandhi attacked PM Modi again, accusing him of being unable to solve the Naga political crisis.

On 18 January, the yatra entered Sivasagar in Assam, where Gandhi termed the state chief minister Himanta Biswa Sarma of being "the most corrupt chief minister in India". Sarma hit back, dubbing the Yatra as "miya yatra", a discriminatory label against Bengali Muslims in Assam. Gandhi entered Arunachal Pradesh on 20 January, received by APCC president Nabam Tuki.

==== Week 2 (21-27 January) ====
The yatra re-entered Assam on 21 January via Rajgarh in Biswanath district. Gandhi entered Meghalaya on 22 January at Nongpoh, before again re-entering Assam the next day. 23 January saw a major show-off between Congress workers and Assam Police when Gandhi was stopped from entering Guwahati city limits, and a barricade erected by police to stop Gandhi from entering the city was broken by crowds. Assam Congress president Bhupen Kumar Borah and party MLA Jakir Hussain Sikdar sustained minor injuries in clashes with police. Gandhi was booked by Assam Police for allegedly inciting violence, to which Gandhi responded that he would not be intimidated by fake cases. The yatra ended up diverting its route and passed instead through Guwahati bypass. Academic and social activist Hiren Gohain condemned the "brazen violence" unleashed by police on yatra marchers.

Gandhi entered Cooch Behar in West Bengal on 25 January and said that he would fight injustice and hatred prevailing across the country.

==== Week 3 (28 January-3 February) ====
Gandhi then reached Kishanganj in Bihar on 28 January, the same day Bihar chief minister Nitish Kumar and his party rejoined the National Democratic Alliance. At Purnia on 30 January, Gandhi said that Kumar had caved in and rejoined the NDA under pressure. He also said that the Mahagathbandhan did not need the Kumar's blessings and that it would keep fighting for social justice. The leadership and cadre of the Communist Party of India (Marxist), including the party state secretary Mohammed Salim joined the yatra at Murshidabad on 1 February. Gandhi entered Pakur in Jharkhand on 2 February.

==== Week 4 (4-10 February) ====
On 6 February, Gandhi announced that he the I.N.D.I.A. bloc would remove the 50% cap on reservation if voted to power. He also said that the BJP wanted to topple the alliance government in Jharkhand as the chief minister was a tribal, referring to Hemant Soren's arrest and resignation as CM. He also congratulated new chief minister Champai Soren for stopping the BJP-RSS conspiracy and "protecting the government of the poor".

The yatra entered Biramitrapur in Odisha on 7 February, where it received a grand welcome. The following day, it entered Raigarh in Chhattisgarh where it took a two-day break. The yatra resumed on 10 February and later passed through Sakti, Korba, Surajpur, and Surguja districts.

==== Week 5 (11-17 February) ====
On 13 February, in the backdrop of farmers' protests, at Ambikapur in Surguja district, Gandhi promised legal guarantee of MSP to farmers if the I.N.D.I.A. bloc came to power. The yatra, which was scheduled to enter Balrampur and then traverse its second leg in Jharkhand on 14 February, was cancelled so that Gandhi could attend farmers' protests in Delhi. On 15 February, Gandhi resumed his yatra from Bihar's Aurangabad, where he promised a financial survey to assess the ground reality if his party comes to power. The yatra resumed from Sasaram the next day, where Rashtriya Janata Dal chairperson and former state deputy CM Tejashwi Yadav joined the yatra, touring the state with Gandhi in a jeep.

Gandhi's yatra entered Chandauli in Uttar Pradesh on 16 February. At Chandauli, Gandhi criticised the red carpet welcome to VVIPs at the Ram Lalla consecration ceremony at Ayodhya.

==== Week 6 (18-24 February) ====
On 17 February, Gandhi offered prayers at the Kashi Vishwanath Temple in Varanasi. The next day, the journey resumed from Prayagraj at the Nehru family's ancestral house at Anand Bhawan. On 19 February, Gandhi reached his former constituency Amethi by entering the village Kohra, where a large number of people attended the rally. On 20 February, in the Congress bastion of Rae Bareli, Gandhi attacked the central government over the Agnipath Scheme, alleging that Agniveers were being denied the status of martyrs. The next day in Lucknow, Gandhi targeted PM Modi over the police recruitment exam paper leak in Uttar Pradesh, saying that youngsters were being misleaded by the BJP.

==== Week 7 (25 February-2 March) ====
Samajwadi Party supremo Akhilesh Yadav joined Gandhi's yatra on 25 February, after the two parties solved the deadlock in seat-sharing for the upcoming Lok Sabha elections.

At Dholpur in Rajasthan, on 26 February, Gandhi said that the women, youth, and farmers of the nation were not getting any opportunity in the development of the nation.

The yatra resumed and entered Morena in Madhya Pradesh on 2 March. At Morena, Gandhi promised legal guarantee of MSP and caste-based census if his party was voted to power. He also attacked the centre over the Agnipath Scheme, and said that the budget that was going to defense was now in the hands of big businessman. The Congress had also promised to scrap the Agnipath Scheme as a part of its manifesto.

==== Week 8 (3-9 March) ====
On 5 March, Gandhi offered prayers at Mahakaleshwar Temple in Ujjain. On 7 March, he entered Banswara, Rajasthan where he announced the Congress's "Youth Manifesto". He also said that the caste census is an X-ray for India, and alleged that president Droupadi Murmu was not allowed to enter the Ram temple as she was from the Adivasi community.

The yatra entered Jhalod, Gujarat on 7 March, where Gandhi criticised prime minister Modi for "waiving off ₹16 lakh crore loans" of corporate businessmen. On 8 March, Gandhi addressed a gathering at Godhra, and ended the day's yatra at Panchmahal. On 9 March at Bharuch, Gandhi said that the BJP calls Adivasi people (tribals) as Vanavasi (forest dweller).

==== Week 9 (10-16 March) ====
Gandhi's yatra reached Maharashtra on 12 March via Nandurbar, where he said that Adivasis were the original owners of the country. The yatra then entered Dhule the next day where Gandhi announced the Congress' women manifesto termed Nari Nyay. It entered Thane on 15 March before concluding on 16 March at Mumbai. Priyanka Gandhi, Congress leader and Gandhi's sister joined the Bharat Jodo Nyay Yatra led by her brother on its last day. The yatra moved through Dharavi, before ending at Dadar's Chaityabhoomi the memorial of B. R. Ambedkar.

== Reactions ==
The ruling Bharatiya Janata Party stated that the citizens of India cannot be deceived by the creation of catchy slogans. BJP reiterated and emphasized that it is the Modi-government which has been delivering "real nyay (justice)" since 2014.

== Crowdfunding ==
The Congress party initiated crowdfunding campaign "Donate for Nyay" on 27 January 2024 to mobilize funds for the yatra. It collected Rs 4 crores in 4 days since start of the campaign. Several political analysts including Prashant Kishor criticized the timing of Yatra in view of upcoming general elections and stated that while its a good PR exercise it will not be able to benefit the congress electorally.

== See also ==
- Bharat Jodo Yatra
- Indian National Congress campaign for the 2024 Indian general election
- Rahul Gandhi – 12th Leader of the Opposition in Lok Sabha since 2024
