= Inflation in India =

Inflation rate in India was 0.71% as of November 2025, as per the Indian Ministry of Statistics and Programme Implementation. This represents a slight increase from the record low of 0.25% observed in October 2025. CPI for the months of July, August and September 2025 were 1.55, 2.50 and 2.90 respectively. Inflation rates in India are usually quoted as changes in the Consumer Price Index (CPI), for all commodities.

Many developing countries use changes in the consumer price index (CPI) as their central measure of inflation. In India, CPI (combined) was declared as the new standard for measuring inflation in April 2014. CPI numbers are typically measured monthly, and with a significant lag, making them unsuitable for policy use. India uses changes in the CPI to measure its rate of inflation.

The WPI measures the price of a representative basket of wholesale goods. In India, this basket is composed of three groups: Primary Articles (22.62% of total weight), Fuel and Power (13.15%) and Manufactured Products (64.23%). Food Articles from the Primary Articles Group account for 15.26% of the total weight. The most important components of the Manufactured Products Group are Food products (19.12%); Chemicals and Chemical products (12%); Basic Metals, Alloys, and Metal Products (10.8%); Machinery and Machine Tools (8.9%); Textiles (7.3%) and Transport, Equipment and Parts (5.2%).

WPI numbers were typically measured weekly by the Ministry of Commerce and Industry. This makes it more timely than the lagging and infrequent CPI statistic. However, since 2009 it has been measured monthly instead of weekly.

== Issues ==
The challenges in a developing economy are many, especially in the context of monetary policy, the Central Bank, and the phenomena of inflation and price stability. There has been a universal argument recently that monetary policy is a key element in depicting and controlling inflation. The Central Bank works on the objective to control and have a stable price for commodities. A good environment of price stability creates saving mobilisation and sustained economic growth. The former Governor of RBI C. Rangarajan points out that there is a long-term trade-off between output and inflation. He adds that short-term trade-off happens to only introduce uncertainty about the price level in future. There is an agreement that the central banks have aimed to introduce the target of price stability while an argument supports it for what that means in practice.

=== Optimal inflation rate ===
It arises as the basic theme in deciding an adequate monetary policy. There are two debatable proportions for an effective inflation: whether it should be in the range of 1-3 per cent as the inflation rate that persists in the industrialized economy or should it be in the range of 6-7 per cent. While deciding on the elaborate inflation rate certain problems occur regarding its measurement. The measurement bias has often calculated an inflation rate that is comparatively more than actual. Secondly, there typically arises an issue when the quality improvements in the product need to be captured out. Hence, it affects the price index. The consumer preference for cheaper goods affects the consumption basket at costs, for the increased expenditure on the cheaper goods takes time for the increased weight and measuring inflation. The Boskin Commission has measured 1.1 per cent of the increased inflation in the USA per annum. The commission points out that comprehensive studies on inflation in developed countries appear to be fairly low.

=== Money supply and inflation ===
Quantitative easing by the central banks with the effect of an increased money supply in an economy typically helps to increase or moderate inflationary targets. There is a puzzle formation between low-rate inflation and a high growth of money supply. When the current rate of inflation is low, a high worth of money supply warrants the tightening of liquidity and an increased interest rate for a moderate aggregate demand and the avoidance of any potential problems. Further, in case of a low output, a tightened monetary policy would affect the production in a much more severe manner. Supply shocks are known to play a dominant role in regard to monetary policy. The bumper harvest in 1998-99 with a buffer yield in wheat, sugarcane, and pulses led to an early supply condition further driving their prices from what they were in the previous year. The increased import competition since 1991 with the trade liberalisation in place has widely contributed to the reduced manufacturing competition with cheaper agricultural raw materials and the fabric industry. These cost-saving-driven technologies have often helped to drive a low inflation rate. The normal growth cycles accompanied by international price pressures have several times been characterized by domestic uncertainties.

=== Global trade ===
Inflation in India generally occurs due to global traded commodities and the several efforts made by the Reserve Bank of India (RBI) to weaken the rupee against the dollar. This was done after the Pokhran Blasts in 1998. This has been regarded as the root cause of the inflation crisis rather than domestic inflation. According to some experts, the policy of the RBI to absorb all dollars coming into the Indian economy contributes to the appreciation of the rupee. When the U.S. dollar depreciated by a margin of 30%, the RBI made a massive injection of dollars into the economy making it highly liquid; this further triggered off inflation in non-traded goods. The RBI picture clearly portrays subsidising exports with a weak dollar-exchange rate. Critics argue that these account for dangerous inflationary policies being followed by the central bank of the country. Further, on account of cheap products being imported in the country which are made on high technological and capital intensive techniques, domestic raw materials in the global market either increase in price or are forced to sell at a cheaper price, hence incurring heavy losses.

== Factors ==
There are several factors which help to determine the inflationary impact in the country and further help in making a comparative analysis of the policies for the same. The major determinant of the inflation in regard to the employment generation and growth is depicted by the Phillips curve. [Image of Phillips curve]

=== Demand factors ===
It occurs in a situation when the aggregate demand in the economy has exceeded the aggregate supply. It could further be described as a situation where too much money chases too few goods. A country has a capacity of producing just 5,500 units of a commodity, but the actual demand in the country is 7,000 units. Hence, as a result of which due to scarcity in supply the prices of the commodity rises. This has generally been seen in India in context with the agrarian society where due to droughts and floods or inadequate methods for the storage of grains leads to lesser or deteriorated output hence increasing the prices for the commodities as the demand remains the same.

=== Supply factors ===
The supply side inflation is a key ingredient for the rising inflation in India. The agricultural scarcity or the damage in transit creates a scarcity causing high inflationary pressures. Similarly, the high cost of labor eventually increases the production cost and leads to a high price for the commodity. The energy issues regarding the cost of production often increases the value of the final output produced. These supply-driven factors basically have a fiscal tool for regulation and moderation. Further, the global level impacts of price rise often impacts inflation from the supply side of the economy.

Consensus on the prime reason for the sticky and stubbornly high Consumer Price Index, that is retail inflation of India, is due to supply side constraints; and still, where interest rate remains the only tool with the Reserve Bank of India. Higher inflation rate also constraints India's manufacturing environment.

=== Domestic factors ===
Developing economies like India generally have a lesser developed financial market which creates a weak bonding between the interest rates and the aggregate demand. This accounts for the real money gap that could be determined as the potential determinant for the price rise and inflation in India. There is a gap in India for both the output and the real money gap. The supply of money grows rapidly while the supply of goods takes due time which causes increased inflation. Similarly, hoarding has been a problem of major concern in India where onion prices have shot high. There are several other stances for the gold and silver commodities and their price hike.

=== External factors ===
The exchange rate determination is an important component for the inflationary pressures that arises in India. The liberal economic perspective in India affects the domestic markets. As the prices in United States rises it impacts India where the commodities are now imported at a higher price impacting the price rise. Hence, the nominal exchange rate and the import inflation are measures that depict the competitiveness and challenges for the economy.

=== Value ===
The annual inflation rate in India was recorded at 6.95% in 2023. Historically, from 1960 until 2023, the annual inflation rate in India averaged 7.37% reaching an all-time high of 28.60% in 1974 and a record low of -7.63% in 1976.

The inflation rate for Primary Articles was at 9.8% in 2012. This breaks down into a rate 7.3% for Food, 9.6% for Non-Food Agriculturals, and 26.6% for Mining Products. The inflation rate for Fuel and Power was at 14.0%. Finally, the inflation rate for Manufactured Articles was at 7.3% in 2012.

== Indices ==
=== 17th century ===
Given below is a comparison of GDP Deflator, average consumer price inflation, cost (for filing tax returns) inflation, gold, silver and house inflation indices in India (collated from IMF, CBDT, RBI and multiple sources). GDP Deflator is a composite index of time series constructed independently by Angus Maddison and government departments (since 1950). Price index is useful in gauging income and profit of sellers, cost index is useful in gauging expenditure and loss of buyers while the gold index helps measure wealth. The gold index is in vogue for three centuries.

Year	GDP Deflator (index 2011 = 100)	Cost Index (CBDT)	Gold Index (RBI)	Silver Index (RBI)	House Index (RBI)
1687	0.100				
1688	0.100				
1689	0.100				
1690	0.100				
1691	0.100				
1692	0.100				
1693	0.099				
1694	0.099				
1695	0.100				
1696	0.110				
1697	0.112				
1698	0.111				
1699	0.107				

=== 18th century ===
Year	GDP Deflator (index 2011 = 100)	Cost Index (CBDT)	Gold Index (RBI)	Silver Index (RBI)	House Index (RBI)
1700	0.106				
1701	0.108				
1702	0.111				
1703	0.109				
1704	0.109				
1705	0.108				
1706	0.110				
1707	0.111				
1708	0.111				
1709	0.110				
1710	0.109				
1711	0.110				
1712	0.110				
1713	0.109				
1714	0.109				
1715	0.108				
1716	0.108				
1717	0.106				
1718	0.107				
1719	0.106				
1720	0.107				
1721	0.106				
1722	0.106				
1723	0.107				
1724	0.106				
1725	0.106				
1726	0.106				
1727	0.107				
1728	0.107				
1729	0.106				
1730	0.105				
1731	0.105				
1732	0.106				
1733	0.107				
1734	0.108				
1735	0.109				
1736	0.107				
1737	0.106				
1738	0.105				
1739	0.105				
1740	0.105				
1741	0.105				
1742	0.105				
1743	0.105				
1744	0.106				
1745	0.106				
1746	0.106				
1747	0.108				
1748	0.106				
1749	0.104				
1750	0.102				
1751	0.101				
1752	0.102				
1753	0.102				
1754	0.102				
1755	0.103				
1756	0.105				
1757	0.104				
1758	0.105				
1759	0.101				
1760	0.100				
1761	0.104				
1762	0.109				
1763	0.108				
1764	0.103				
1765	0.104				
1766	0.105				
1767	0.106				
1768	0.106				
1769	0.106				
1770	0.105				
1771	0.105				
1772	0.104				
1773	0.103				
1774	0.102				
1775	0.103				
1776	0.102				
1777	0.101				
1778	0.102				
1779	0.103				
1780	0.103				
1781	0.103				
1782	0.101				
1783	0.102				
1784	0.103				
1785	0.104				
1786	0.104				
1787	0.104				
1788	0.102				
1789	0.103				
1790	0.105				
1791	0.105				
1792	0.106				
1793	0.105				
1794	0.107				
1795	0.109				
1796	0.109				
1797	0.108				
1798	0.109				
1799	0.110				

=== 19th century ===
Year	GDP Deflator (index 2011 = 100)	Cost Index (CBDT)	Gold Index (RBI)	Silver Index (RBI)	House Index (RBI)
1800	0.110				
1801	0.109				
1802	0.109				
1803	0.110				
1804	0.111				
1805	0.114				
1806	0.113				
1807	0.114				
1808	0.120				
1809	0.121				
1810	0.121				
1811	0.133				
1812	0.146				
1813	0.155				
1814	0.129				
1815	0.126				
1816	0.110				
1817	0.108				
1818	0.113				
1819	0.110				
1820	0.110				
1821	0.112				
1822	0.111				
1823	0.111				
1824	0.110				
1825	0.110				
1826	0.110				
1827	0.110				
1828	0.110				
1829	0.110				
1830	0.111				
1831	0.110				
1832	0.110				
1833	0.111				
1834	0.110				
1835	0.111				
1836	0.110				
1837	0.111				
1838	0.111				
1839	0.110				
1840	0.109				
1841	0.110				
1842	0.111				
1843	0.111				
1844	0.111				
1845	0.111				
1846	0.111				
1847	0.111				
1848	0.111				
1849	0.110				
1850	0.110				
1851	0.108				
1852	0.109				
1853	0.107				
1854	0.107				
1855	0.108				
1856	0.108				
1857	0.107				
1858	0.108				
1859	0.106				
1860	0.107				
1861	0.108				
1862	0.107				
1863	0.108				
1864	0.108				
1865	0.108				
1866	0.108				
1867	0.109				
1868	0.109				
1869	0.109				
1870	0.109	-	0.090	-	-
1871	0.106	-	0.090	-	-
1872	0.114	-	0.091	-	-
1873	0.121	-	0.092	-	-
1874	0.117	-	0.094	-	-
1875	0.112	-	0.096	-	-
1876	0.113	-	0.103	-	-
1877	0.115	-	0.100	-	-
1878	0.112	-	0.104	-	-
1879	0.124	-	0.106	-	-
1880	0.137	-	0.105	-	-
1881	0.153	-	0.106	-	-
1882	0.159	-	0.105	-	-
1883	0.160	-	0.108	-	-
1884	0.152	-	0.108	-	-
1885	0.144	-	0.112	-	-
1886	0.156				
1887	0.161				
1888	0.168				
1889	0.172				
1890	0.178	-	0.114	-	-
1891	0.201				
1892	0.196				
1893	0.180				
1894	0.162				
1895	0.183				
1896	0.196				
1897	0.172				
1898	0.192				
1899	0.224				

=== 20th century ===
Year	GDP Deflator (index 2011 = 100)	Cost Index (CBDT)	Gold Index (RBI)	Silver Index (RBI)	House Index (RBI)
1900	0.228				
1901	0.242				
1902	0.242				
1903	0.257				
1904	0.254				
1905	0.291				
1906	0.306				
1907	0.354				
1908	0.311				
1909	0.293				
1910	0.304				
1911	0.314				
1912	0.342				
1913	0.365				
1914	0.320				
1915	0.347				
1916	0.430				
1917	0.525				
1918	0.760				
1919	0.688	-	0.113	-	-
1920	0.838				
1921	0.650				
1922	0.624	-	0.098	-	-
1923	0.755	-	0.091	-	-
1924	0.735	-	0.089	-	-
1925	0.758	-	0.078	-	-
1926	0.792	-	0.078	-	-
1927	0.783	-	0.078	-	-
1928	0.795	-	0.077	-	-
1929	0.812	-	0.078	-	-
1930	0.712	-	0.078	-	-
1931	0.602	-	0.084	-	-
1932	0.458	-	0.107	-	-
1933	0.439	-	0.105	-	-
1934	0.510	-	0.126	-	-
1935	0.573	-	0.130	-	-
1936	0.631	-	0.128	-	-
1937	0.704	-	0.128	-	-
1938	0.661	-	0.130	-	-
1939	0.692	-	0.143	-	-
1940	0.740	-	0.159	-	-
1941	0.912	-	0.159	-	-
1942	1.177	-	0.159	-	-
1943	1.384	-	0.159	-	-
1944	1.544	-	0.159	-	-
1945	1.596	-	0.159	-	-
1946	1.676	-	0.159	-	-
1947	1.829	-	0.159	-	-
1948	1.988	-	0.158	-	-
1949	1.902	-	0.173	-	-
1950	2.057	-	0.229	-	-
1951	2.123	-	0.229	-	-
1952	2.031	-	0.228	-	-
1953	2.083	-	0.227	-	-
1954	1.879	-	0.228	-	-
1955	1.853	-	0.229	-	-
1956	2.091	-	0.228	-	-
1957	2.162	-	0.228	-	-
1958	2.245	-	0.227	-	-
1959	2.304	-	0.227	-	-
1960	2.392	-	0.228	-	-
1961	2.443	-	0.228	-	-
1962	2.551	-	0.228	-	-
1963	2.764	-	0.228	-	-
1964	3.000	-	0.228	-	-
1965	3.250	-	0.228	-	-
1966	3.681	-	0.288	-	-
1967	3.998	-	0.360	-	-
1968	4.095	-	0.404	-	-
1969	4.232	-	0.429	-	-
1970	4.298	-	0.376	1.383	-
1971	4.527	-	0.423	1.211	-
1972	5.017	-	0.604	1.529	-
1973	5.912	-	1.106	2.698	-
1974	6.897	-	1.752	3.902	-
1975	6.784	-	1.850	4.066	-
1976	7.189	-	1.535	4.305	-
1977	7.595	-	1.776	4.352	-
1978	7.782	-	2.165	5.197	-
1979	9.006	-	3.427	15.106	-
1980	10.042	-	6.600	13.401	-
1981	11.129	10.000	5.449	8.724	-
1982	12.031	10.900	4.867	9.431	-
1983	13.060	11.600	5.848	11.722	-
1984	14.094	12.500	5.590	9.367	-
1985	15.108	13.300	5.349	7.987	-
1986	16.134	14.000	6.337	7.400	-
1987	17.639	15.000	7.916	10.055	-
1988	19.091	16.100	8.320	9.905	-
1989	20.702	17.200	8.469	9.487	-
1990	22.911	18.200	9.194	8.597	-
1991	26.061	19.900	11.267	10.899	-
1992	28.398	22.300	13.267	12.499	-
1993	31.198	24.400	15.422	15.803	-
1994	34.312	25.900	16.522	17.291	-
1995	37.422	28.100	17.068	19.364	-
1996	40.256	30.500	18.869	19.208	-
1997	42.863	33.100	16.510	20.513	-
1998	46.297	35.100	16.676	23.813	-
1999	47.717	38.900	16.487	24.288	-

=== 21st century ===
Year	GDP Deflator (index 2011 = 100)	Cost Index (CBDT)	Gold Index (RBI)	Silver Index (RBI)	House Index (RBI)
2000	49.457	40.600	17.214	23.700	-
2001	51.048	42.600	17.555	22.362	-
2002	52.944	44.700	20.676	24.228	-
2003	54.992	46.300	23.211	26.608	-
2004	58.141	48.000	25.374	32.555	-
2005	61.409	49.700	26.800	38.057	-
2006	66.568	51.900	37.399	60.446	-
2007	71.191	55.100	39.311	62.460	-
2008	77.736	58.200	51.790	66.864	-
2009	83.209	63.200	64.353	79.933	-
2010	91.968	71.100	76.495	116.836	53.300
2011	100.000	78.500	100.000	181.068	67.050
2012	107.934	85.200	123.907	177.763	80.400
2013	114.612	93.900	113.067	138.810	90.250
2014	118.430	102.400	105.716	118.703	106.050
2015	121.130	108.100	101.825	106.972	109.550
2016	125.052	112.500	114.900	127.866	121.000
2017	130.016	115.900	112.055	116.539	129.100
2018	135.066	119.280	118.634	115.134	133.350
2019	138.295	-	133.678	-	-
2020	146.041	-	179.1182	-	-
2021	160.062	-	181.712	-	-
