= Gurdip Singh (professor) =

Professor

Gurdip Singh is a professor from Gwalior, India. He is a senior professor of Ayurveda and the Director of Post Graduate Studies at the SDM College of Ayurveda and Hospital in Hassan, Karnataka. He is considered an authority on the Ayurveda work Charaka Samhita. Singh was a dean of Institute for Post Graduate Teaching and Research in Ayurveda at Gujarat Ayurved University at Jamnagar, Gujarat.

He was awarded the Padma Shri, the fourth highest civilian award of India, in 2020 under Gujarat state for contribution in the field of medicine. He received Padma Shri on 8 November 2021.
