= Gurdip Singh =

Prof. (Dr.) Gurdip Singh
- Education: University of Delhi
- Awards: National Law Day Award (2013)
- Website: rmlnlu.ac.in/gurdipsingh.html

Prof. Gurdip Singh was the vice-chancellor of Dr. Ram Manohar Lohiya National Law University in Lucknow, India. He was also a professor at the University of Delhi, where he had studied as well.
