= Bharat Jodo Yatra =

Mass movement by the Indian National Congress

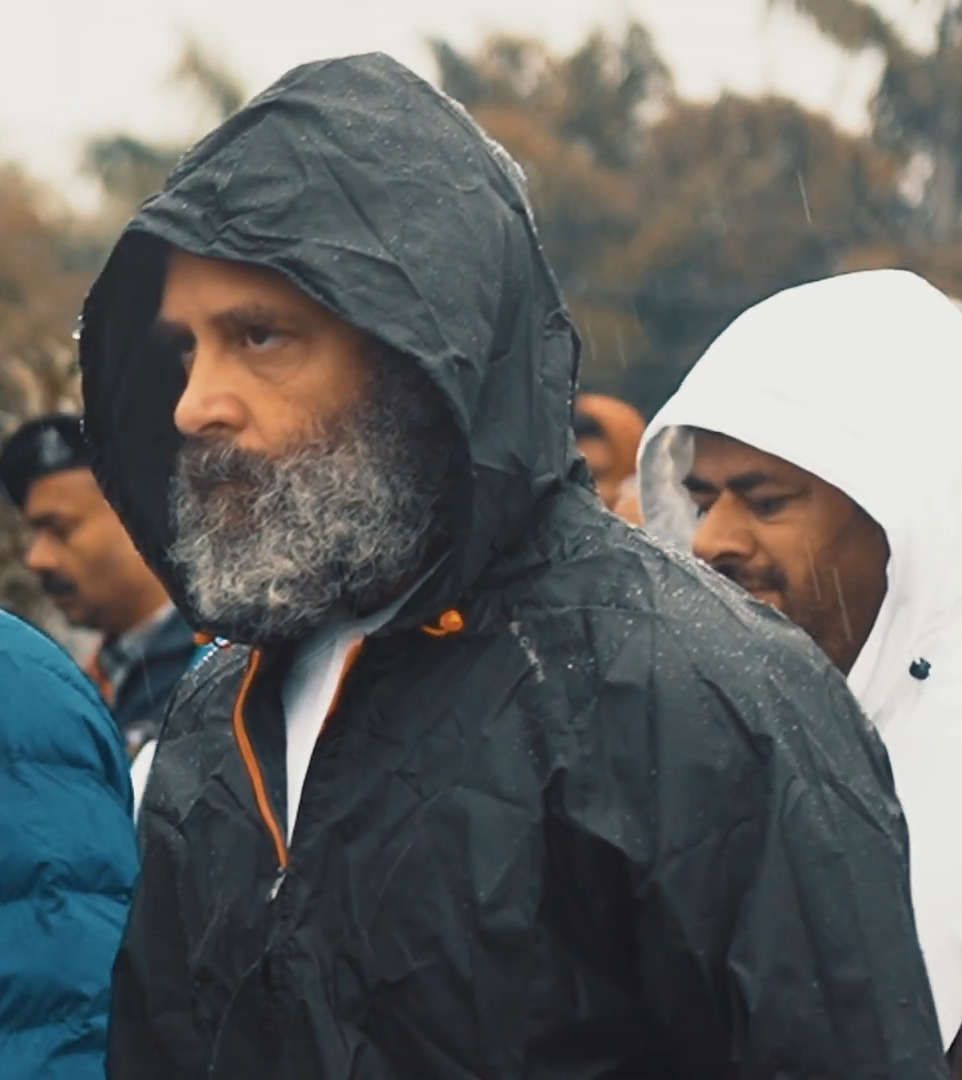
- Rahul Gandhi in Kathua, Jammu and Kashmir marching amidst drizzling rain on 20th January, 2023.
- Date: 7 September 2022 – 30 January 2023
- Duration: 136 days
- Location: India
- Type: Padayatra, protest
- Theme: Political movement, social movement
- Organized by: Indian National Congress, Rahul Gandhi
- Participants: Politicians, citizens, civil society organisations, political activists
- Website: bharatjodoyatra.in

Bharat Jodo Yatra (lit. 'Unite India March') was a mass movement which was held by the Indian National Congress ("the Congress" or INC as short form). Senior Congress leader Rahul Gandhi orchestrated the movement by encouraging the party cadre and the public to walk from Kanyakumari at the southern tip of India to the union territory of Jammu and Kashmir, a journey of 4,080 kilometres (2,540 miles) over almost 150 days.

According to the INC, the movement was intended to unite the country against the "divisive politics" of the Bharatiya Janata Party (BJP)-led Government of India. The Bharat Jodo Yatra movement was launched by Rahul Gandhi and Tamil Nadu chief minister M. K. Stalin; on 7 September 2022. It was claimed that its main objective was to protest against the politics of "fear, bigotry and prejudice", and the economics of livelihood destruction, increasing unemployment and growing inequality. During the movement, the INC elected a new party president and also won a majority in the 2022 Himachal Pradesh Legislative Assembly election, its first majority it won by itself since 2018, thus repeating a pattern of change of state governments each election in Himachal Pradesh. Also talking about the notable loss in the period was the heavy drubbing of INC in the 2022 Gujarat legislative assembly election, falling to its lowest ever tally in Gujarat ever since the formation of the state.

== Background ==
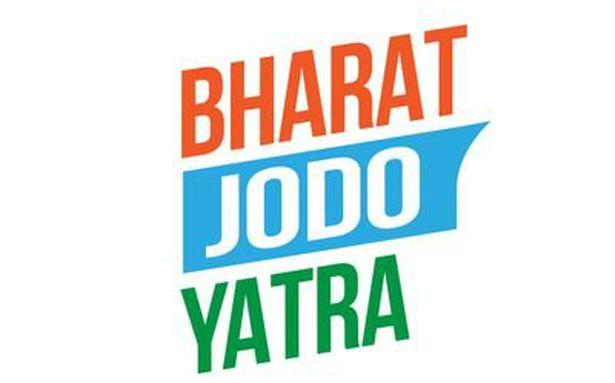
Flag of the Bharat Jodo Yatra, used during the rally

The Indian National Congress launched the logo, tagline, and website for Bharat Jodo Yatra at AICC headquarters on 23 August 2022. The march started from Kanyakumari on 7 September. It was planned as a 3,570-kilometre (2,220-mile)-long, 150-day "non-stop" march that would pass through 12 states and two Union Territories. During the march, Congress Member of Parliament (MP) Rahul Gandhi would meet people during the day and would sleep in makeshift accommodation at night. These makeshift accommodations were mobile ontainers specially built by Tata Corporation. The march started from Kanyakumari and was to end in Srinagar, and would be accomplished entirely on foot. Marchers were scheduled to cover approximately 23 km (14 miles) each day in two shifts.

By December 2022, the march had covered more than 3,000 km (1,900 mi). The Bharat Jodo Yatra has similarities to ex-prime minister of India Chandra Shekhar's nearly 4,260-kilometre (2,650-mile)-long Bharat Yatra march of 1983.

== Schedule ==
All India – Yatra Schedule
State / UT	Entry Date	No. of days	Key places
Tamil Nadu	7 & 29 September	4	Kanyakumari
Kerala	10 September	18	Thiruvananthapuram, Kochi, Nilambur
Karnataka	30 September	21	Mysore, Bellary, Raichur
Andhra Pradesh	18 October	4	D. Hirehal, Alur
Telangana	23 October	12	Vikarabad, Hyderabad
Maharashtra	7 November	14	Nanded, Jalgaon Jamod
Madhya Pradesh	23 November	16	Mhow, Indore, Ujjain
Rajasthan	4 December	18	Jhalawar, Alwar, Kota, Dausa
Haryana	21 December & 6 January	12	Ambala, Nuh, Faridabad
Delhi	24 December	2	Badarpur, Rajghat
Uttar Pradesh	3 January	5	Ghaziabad, Bulandshahr
Punjab	10 January	11	Pathankot
Himachal Pradesh	18 January	1	Kangra district
Jammu and Kashmir	19 January	11	Lakhanpur, Jammu, Srinagar

== Methods ==
The Bharat Jodo Yatra used a variety of slogans, poetry, and songs, such as Mile Kadam, Jude Vatan (walk together, unite the country), Mehengai Se Nata Todo, Mil Kar Bharat Jodo (break ties with inflation, unite India), Berozagari Ka Jaal Todo, Bharat Jodo (break the web of unemployment, unite India), Nafrat Chhodo, Bharat Jodo (quit hate, unite the country) and Samvidhan Bachao (save the constitution) among others. Marchers, who were termed padayatris, would speak with members of civil society every day during the break. Public rallies were also held during the march. On 15 October, Rahul Gandhi's public gathering in Ballari amid heavy rainfall got widespread media coverage.

== Participants ==
Throughout the five-month long yatra, there were three types of Padyatris. Bharat Yatris, who will walk the yatra throughout its whole journey. Atithi Yatris, guest marchers from states through which Bharat Jodo Yatra is not travelling, will be the second group. The third group to finish the march will be the Pradesh Yatris, a group of 100 yatris from states the march is travelling through and they will be a part of the yatra in that state. Three hundred padyatris will be marching at any moment. Few prominent people joining the yatra are

- Rahul Gandhi, former president of Indian National Congress
- Sonia Gandhi, INC leader
- Jairam Ramesh, Member of Parliament, Rajya Sabha
- Bhupesh Baghel, then Chief Minister of Chhattisgarh
- Pawan Khera, AICC social media chairman
- Kanhaiya Kumar, political activist from Indian National Congress
- Vijay Inder Singla, former Punjab cabinet minister
- Siddaramaiah, former Chief Minister of Karnataka
- Oommen Chandy, former Chief Minister of Kerala
- Sukhvinder Singh Sukhu, current Chief Minister of Himachal Pradesh
- Mukesh Agnihotri, deputy Chief Minister of Himachal Pradesh
- Ashok Gehlot, former Chief Minister of Rajasthan
- Sachin Pilot, former deputy chief minister of Rajasthan
- Digvijaya Singh, former Chief Minister of Madhya Pradesh
- Revanth Reddy, president of Telangana PCC
- Pratibha Singh, HPCC Chief
- Aaditya Thackeray, Shiv Sena leader
- Praniti Shinde, MLA from Maharashtra
- Supriya Sule, MP NCP, daughter of Sharad Pawar
- Jayant Patil, NCP Maharashtra President
- Jitendra Awhad, NCP politician
- Tushar Gandhi, author, Great-grandson of Mahatma Gandhi
- Mani Shankar Aiyar, former MP for Mayiladuthurai.
- Charanjit Singh Channi, former Chief Minister of Punjab
- Chandy Oommen, National outreach Chairman of Indian Youth Congress
- Swara Bhasker, actress and political activist
- Urmila Matondkar, Actress and politician
- Nagma, actress and politician
- Kanimozhi, MP of DMK
- Nana Patole,INC politician
- Kamal Haasan, actor and politician president of Makkal Needhi Maiam
- Farooq Abdullah, former Chief Minister of Jammu and Kashmir
- Santokh Singh Chaudhary, MP from Jalandhar
- Mohammad Azharuddin, Former Indian Cricket Captain and Telangana PCC President

=== Supporters ===
Many grassroots movements have been joining or endorsing the Bharat Jodo Yatra. The INC appealed to individuals, organizations, and movements to join the yatra. More than 200 civil society members have appealed people to support Congress' Bharat Jodo Yatra. The Congress invited Chief Minister of Bihar Nitish Kumar and deputy chief minister Tejashwi Yadav to join the yatra respectively. Nitish Kumar declined to join the Bharat Jodo Yatra.

In late September, as the march was set to enter Karnataka, at least 89 organizations based in the state announced their support for and participation in the protest march. Prominent participants in the Karnataka phase of the march include author Devanur Mahadeva and literary critic G. N. Devy.

- Admiral Laxminarayan Ramdas, former Chief of the Naval Staff with his wife
- Radhika Vemula, Dalit Activist, mother of Rohith Vemula
- Priyanka Gandhi, (INC leader) with her husband Robert Vadra
- Raghuram Rajan, former Governor of the Reserve Bank of India
- Sunidhi Chauhan, singer
- Mridula Mukherjee, historian
- Captain Bana Singh, Indian Army, Param Vir Chakra awardee
- Perumal Murugan, author
- Prashant Bhushan, lawyer and rights activist
- Medha Patkar, Social Activist
- Harsh Mander, social activist and writer, Prof. In IIT Delhi
- Aruna Roy, co-founder of the Mazdoor Kisan Shakti Sangathan (MKSS)
- Yogendra Yadav, founder of Swaraj India
- G. N. Devy, writer and cultural activist
- Syeda Hameed, former member of the Planning Commission
- Bezwada Wilson, the founder of the Safai Karmachari Andolan
- Mrinal Pande, Indian journalist
- Dharamvir Gandhi, former MP from the Aam Aadmi Party
- Anjali Bhardwaj, Indian social activist
- Kavita and Indira Lokesh, mother and sister of Gauri Lankesh
- Sujata Rao, Indian civil society member
- Prof. Vipin Tripathi, physicist
- Abhijit Sengupta, Indian civil society member
- Sridhar Radhakrishnan, environmental activist
- Akshay Shimpi, poet and actor
- C. R. Neelakandan, environmental activist
- Amol Palekar and Sandhya Gokhale, Director and Writer
- Onir, film director
- Pooja Bhatt, actress and director
- Rashami Desai, actress
- Riya Sen, actress
- Akanksha Puri, actress and model
- Sushant Singh, actor
- Digangana Suryavanshi, actress and author
- T. M. Krishna, singer
- Mona Ambegaonkar, actress
- Riya Sen, Actress
- Ramesh Pisharody, Comedian

=== Timeline ===
==== September ====
Rahul Gandhi launched the yatra on 7 September 2022 at Kanyakumari. The yatra reached Kollam on 14 September, where Gandhi met local cashew workers. The yatra also entered Alappuzha, and Kochi.

The Kerala High Court dismissed plea to regulate the Bharat Jodo Yatra. The marchers entered Thrissur, Malappuram, and Gudalur in Tamil Nadu on 29 September.

On 30 September, the yatra entered Karnataka.

==== October ====
On 4 October, the yatra took a break at Mandya. On 6 October, Sonia Gandhi joined the yatra. It reached Chitradurga district on 11 October, where Gandhi met unemployed youth.

The yatra entered Anantapur district in Andhra Pradesh on 14 October. It re-entered Karnataka the day later, completing 1,000 km (620 mi) in Bellary district, entering Kurnool district Andhra Pradesh on 18 October, before returning to Karnataka three days later. The yatra entered Telangana on 23 October, followed by a three-day Diwali break.

It resumed in Telangana on 27 October, passing through Mahabubnagar, Narayanpet, Sangareddy, and Ranga Reddy districts. On 29 October 2022, the marchers reached Jadcherla, a town in Mahabubnagar district.

==== November ====
On 1 November 2022, Late Dalit scholar Rohith Vemula's mother joined the Bharat Jodo Yatra to walk alongside Rahul Gandhi, en route to Hyderabad. Rahul Gandhi crossed 19 assembly segments of Telangana, traversing Shamshabad, Aramghar, Bahadurpura, Charminar, Afzalgunj, Mozzamjahi Market, Nampally (Gandhi Bhavan), Balanagar, Moosapet Y-junction, Kukatpally, Miyapur, BHEL, Patancheru (via NH-65). The yatra covered almost 60 km from Shamshabad to Muthangi (ORR). On the evening of 7 November 2022, the 61st day of the march, Bharat Jodo Yatra entered Maharashtra, crossing from Menuru village in Madnoor Mandal district of Telangana to Nanded district in Maharashtra.

On 11 November 2022, Shiv Sena, leader and former Maharashtra Minister Aaditya Thackeray joined the Bharat Jodo Yatra in Hingoli district. On 16 November 2022, activist Medha Patkar joined Bharat Jodo Yatra in Washim. On 19 November, the birthday of Indira Gandhi actor-turned-politician Nagma joined the march in Buldhana district. On 24 November 2022, Congress leader Priyanka Gandhi and her husband Robert Vadra joined Bharat Jodo Yatra in Madhya Pradesh.

In Burhanpur, Rahul Gandhi met with banana-plantation and powerloom workers. Former CM of Madhya Pradesh Digvijaya Singh underplayed the electoral impact of the yatra.

Congress communication chief Jairam Ramesh said the yatra had given the party confidence to undertake similar marches from west to east in 2023. Rahul Gandhi described both Ashok Gehlot and Sachin Pilot as assets to the party.

==== December ====
Bharat Jodo Yatra first entered a Congress-ruled state, Rajasthan on 4 December 2022. On 13 December, Bharat Jodo Yatra resumed from Jeenapur in Sawai Madhopur district, Rajasthan. The following day, former Reserve Bank of India (RBI) governor Raghuram Rajan joined Bharat Jodo Yatra in Sawai Madhopur district.

Bharat Jodo Yatra completed 100 days on 16 December 2022. Himachal Pradesh Chief Minister Sukhvinder Singh Sukhu, Mukesh Agnihotri deputy CM, and the state's Congress chief Pratibha Singh walked alongside Rahul Gandhi. Singer Sunidhi Chauhan performed at a concert marking the completion of 100 days of the protest at Albert Hall Museum in Jaipur on 16 December.

Former Punjab chief minister Charanjit Singh Channi joined Bharat Jodo Yatra at Alwar on 20 December 2022. The next day, the protest march entered Haryana from Mundaka in Nuh district, and resumed from Patan Udaipuri in Nuh, Haryana after a flag-handover ceremony. On 23 December, Dravida Munnetra Kazhagam (DMK) MP Kanimozhi joined Bharat Jodo Yatra. She said she was delighted to be a part of the foot march that celebrates India's diversity.

On 24 December, Bharat Jodo Yatra entered Delhi at Badarpur after resuming from NHPC Chowk metro station. Makkal Needhi Maiam (MNM) president and actor-turned politician Kamal Haasan joined the march in New Delhi.

On 9 December 2022, Congress General Secretary (Communications) Jairam Ramesh said Bharat Jodo Yatra would take a nine-day break on 25 December and resume on 3 January 2023.

==== January 2023 ====
The Bharat Jodo Yatra resumed its second leg from Kashmir gate in Delhi on 3 January 2023. According senior Congress leader Jaiprakash Agarwal, the protest was "echoing the voice of the citizens". Bharat Jodo Yatra entered Uttar Pradesh from Loni in Ghaziabad district. Former Research and Analysis Wing chief A. S. Dulat, and former Jammu and Kashmir Chief Minister Farooq Abdullah joined Bharat Jodo Yatra.

Bharat Jodo Yatra entered Punjab at Shambhu on 10 January 2023. Rahul Gandhi visited the Golden Temple in Amritsar before the yatra started in the state. On 14 January, Congress MP from Jalandhar Santokh Singh Chaudhary died during the march after suffering a heart attack in Phillaur. On 15 January, father of late Punjabi singer Sidhu Moose Wala and historian Mridula Mukherjee joined Bharat Jodo Yatra.

On 18 January 2023, Bharat Jodo Yatra entered Himachal Pradesh and travelled 24 km (15 mi) in the state. The following evening, the protest march entered Jammu and Kashmir at Pathankot with a flag-handover ceremony at Lakhanpur in Kathua district. National Conference President and MP Farooq Abdullah stated he joined the yatra to highlight the need to strengthen the idea of unity in diversity, and said Rahul Gandhi was "doing the job of joining the hearts of people". On 20 January 2023, Param Vir Chakra recipient Captain Bana Singh joined Bharat Jodo Yatra in Jammu and Kashmir.

On 24 January 2023, Actor-politician Urmila Matondkar and prominent author Perumal Murugan joined the Bharat Jodo Yatra in Jammu's garrison town of Nagrota. By the time the Yatra reached Srinagar, it had covered 3,122 km (1,940 mi) from Gandhi Mandapam in Kanyakumari. The 137 day long foot march was officially ended at Srinagar's Lal Chowk.

== Reactions ==
- The Bharatiya Janata Party (BJP) criticized the rally and called it "Parivar Bachao Rally" (Save Family March). At that time, the Congress was preparing to hold its presidential election. On 18 September, BJP Tamil Nadu president C.T. Ravi posted a picture of Rahul Gandhi and his niece on Twitter; Ravi deleted the tweet after public outrage and a case was filed against him. The Congress replied, saying the BJP was "rattled" by the yatra and its immense public support.
- The Dravida Munnetra Kazhagam supported the Yatra; M.K. Stalin was present to launch the Yatra at Kanyakumari on 7 September 2022.
- The Nationalist Congress Party (NCP) initially distanced itself from the yatra; its leader P. C. Chacko said; "Congress's yatra is aimed to prove it is not dead". NCP chief Sharad Pawar, however, dubbed the yatra "immensely useful" for the Congress and Rahul Gandhi. Senior NCP leaders Jayant Patil, Supriya Sule, and Jitendra Awhad joined the Bharat Jodo Yatra when it entered the state of Maharashtra.
- The Shiv Sena (UBT) (SS (UBT)) through its publication Saamana supported the yatra and accused the BJP of being scared of the protest march. SS (UBT) leader Sanjay Raut stated Rahul Gandhi keeps friendship and affection alive despite political differences. Raut attributed the tremendous response to the march to love and compassion.
- The Aam Aadmi Party dismissed the yatra, saying it is of "no consequence".
- The Communist Party of India (Marxist) (CPI(M))initially criticized the Congress in a Twitter post that read; "18 days in Kerala...2 days in UP. Strange way to fight BJP-RSS". The Congress said Kerala is a long south-to-north state; "It takes 370 kilometres from Kanyakumari to go through Kerala and reach Karnataka. If it took two days of rest days, it would take 18 days to cover that distance." The CPI(M)'s general secretary Sitaram Yechury said; "Every party has the legitimate right to interact with the populace. Going to people is good". He also said that the CPI(M) would join efforts to unite the opposition parties to defend the constitution.
- The People's Democratic Party supported the yatra, with party chief Mehbooba Mufti accepting the Congress's invitation to join it (in Jammu & Kashmir) and praised Rahul Gandhi for his "efforts to unite India".
- Yogendra Yadav of Swaraj India joined Bharat Jodo Yatra and described the march as a Dakshinayana movement of India, in which the influences of the south are carried to the north.
- The Hindu-nationalist organisation Rashtriya Swayamsevak Sangh's chief Mohan Bhagwat appealed to minorities in the country, shortly after the start of the yatra. The INC saw this sudden outreach as an effect of the yatra's success.
- Senior Vishwa Hindu Parishad (VHP) leader and the Ram Temple trust's general secretary, Champat Rai acknowledged Rahul Gandhi and stated: "A 50-year-old 'young' man is walking in this chilling weather to know India. What else we can do if not appreciate his efforts."

== Controversies ==
The Bharat Jodo Yatra was criticized for not passing through the poll-bound states of Gujarat and Himachal Pradesh. Congress leader Jairam Ramesh defended the decision, stating this was because it would take 90–95 days to reach Gujarat, starting from Kanyakumari; according to Ramesh, "It would be impossible to reach before the elections, same with Himachal Pradesh". He also said in the states where the yatra would not be able to go, he and another senior Congress leader Digvijaya Singh, along with many others, would visit them.

== Resistance ==
The Congress and the BJP got into an argument after hoardings in Gundlupet, Karnataka, welcoming Bharat Jodo Yatra were ripped down on 29 September 2022. One poster depicted Savarkar. Congress attributed the problem to "miscreants". Savarkar's image was previously seen on a Bharat Jodo Yatra poster in Kerala.

=== Protests ===
During the Karnataka leg of the yatra, the Congress experienced a few problems. Following the appearance of Rahul Gandhi's image on the Karnataka flag, pro-Kannada people protested against the image and warned the Congress not to use Gandhi's image on the flag.

Farmers protested during the Rajasthan leg of the yatra, protesting against the failure of the state's Congress-led government to deliver on Rahul Gandhi's election promise of a farm-loan waiver. They also complained about water scarcity.

=== Petitions in High Court ===
Division Bench of the Kerala High Court dismissed a public-interest lawsuit that sought to control Bharat Jodo Yatra, which the petitioner said was impeding both vehicular and pedestrian traffic on public streets.

== Impact ==
On the fourth day of the Bharat Jodo Yatra, Rahul Gandhi reopened a road that had been closed in 1993 due to caste-based violence. In Badanavalu, a route called "Bharat Jodo Road" connects Lingayat settlements with Dalit dwellings. According to officials, on 7 October 2022, Rajasthan's Chief Minister Ashok Gehlot officially opened a 2.8-kilometre (1.7-mile) elevated road in Jaipur. According to them, the chief minister renamed the route, which was formerly known as Sodala elevated road, to "Bharat Jodo Setu".

=== Other planned yatras ===
The Indian National Congress, inspired by the success of Bharat Jodo Yatra, started or planned separate-but-related yatras in other states.

On 1 November, the Congress started a yatra in Assam that went from Dhubri to Sadiya, covering around 850 km (530 mi) across the state. In Odisha, a yatra covered 2,400 km (1,500 mi) and lasted for 100 days, starting on 31 October as a show of strength for the Congress. The rally started from Bhubaneswar and transited cities Cuttack, Jajpur, Balasore, and others. Many Congress party state units also started mass-contact programs.

The then former chief minister of Karnataka Siddaramaiah, and the then KPCC president D. K. Shivakumar organised a new yatra beginning in early December that visited all 224 assembly constituencies to maintain the momentum started by Bharat Jodo Yatra until the 2023 Assembly election.

=== Responses ===
Basavaraj Bommai, the chief minister of Karnataka, and BJP politician BS Yediyurappa launched a countermarch named "Jana Sankalpa Yatra" on 11 October 2022; this yatra would visit 52 assembly constituencies as a political response to the Congress' Bharat Jodo Yatra.

The BJP started a march called "Jan Aakrosh Yatra" in Rajasthan on 1 December as a protest against the Ashok Gehlot government in the state. Turnout for the event was poor, it received low public support, and the BJP leaders expressed displeasure with the issue.

Though having received invitations from the Congress Party, Bahujan Samaj party leader Mayawati and Samajwadi party leader Akhilesh Yadav did not participate in Bharat Jodo Yatra.

== Aftermath ==
According to a November 2022 survey by CVoter, Rahul Gandhi's approval ratings rose drastically after the Bharat Jodo Yatra, although they were still a bit low compared to January 2019 ratings.

Many political analysts have determined that the yatra has resulted in a resurgent public image of Gandhi, which had been long damaged by the BJP.

In the subsequent elections in Karnataka and Telangana in 2023, Congress registered a landslide victory with an increase in both the party's vote share and the number of seats, compared to the previous elections, in the constituencies through which the march had passed. The Congress Party attributes its success in the Karnataka elections at least in part to the success of the Bharat Jodo Yatra: "The Congress party has attributed its success in the 2023 Karnataka election to the Bharat Jodo Yatra, declaring it the "clear winner" in the clash of narratives between Prime Minister Narendra Modi and the nationwide foot march." After the yatra Congress won Karnataka and Telangana but it suffered crushing defeats in Madhya Pradesh, Rajasthan and Chhattisgarh by the Bhartiya Janata Party.

== Other yatras ==
In September 2022, the Congress Party said it planned to hold a second phase of the yatra from west-to-east in 2023, from Gujarat to Arunachal Pradesh.

On 26 February 2023, Congress General Secretary in-charge Communications Jairam Ramesh informed that Congress is considering a Pasighat-to-Porbandar yatra.

On 14 Aug 2023, the New Indian Express reported about the planned Bharat Jodo Yatra 2.0: "A team of top Congress leaders, including K C Venugopal and Jairam Ramesh, is finalising the route in consultation with Rahul Gandhi and leaders of the states the Yatra will pass through."

=== Bharat Jodo Nyay Yatra ===
On 27 December 2023, the Congress Party announced Bharat Jodo Nyay Yatra ("India Unity and Justice March"). The march will start on 14 January 2024 from Manipur and end on 20 March in Mumbai. It will cover 6,200 kilometres across 14 states. Unlike the Bharat Jodo Yatra, which focused on campaigning against communalism and divisive politics, the Bharat Nyay Yatra will focus on livelihood issues such as inflation and unemployment. Like the Bharat Jodo Yatra, the Bharat Nyay Yatra will also be led by Rahul Gandhi.

== See also ==
- Ram Rath Yatra
