= Rahul Gandhi =

12th Leader of the Opposition in Lok Sabha since 2024

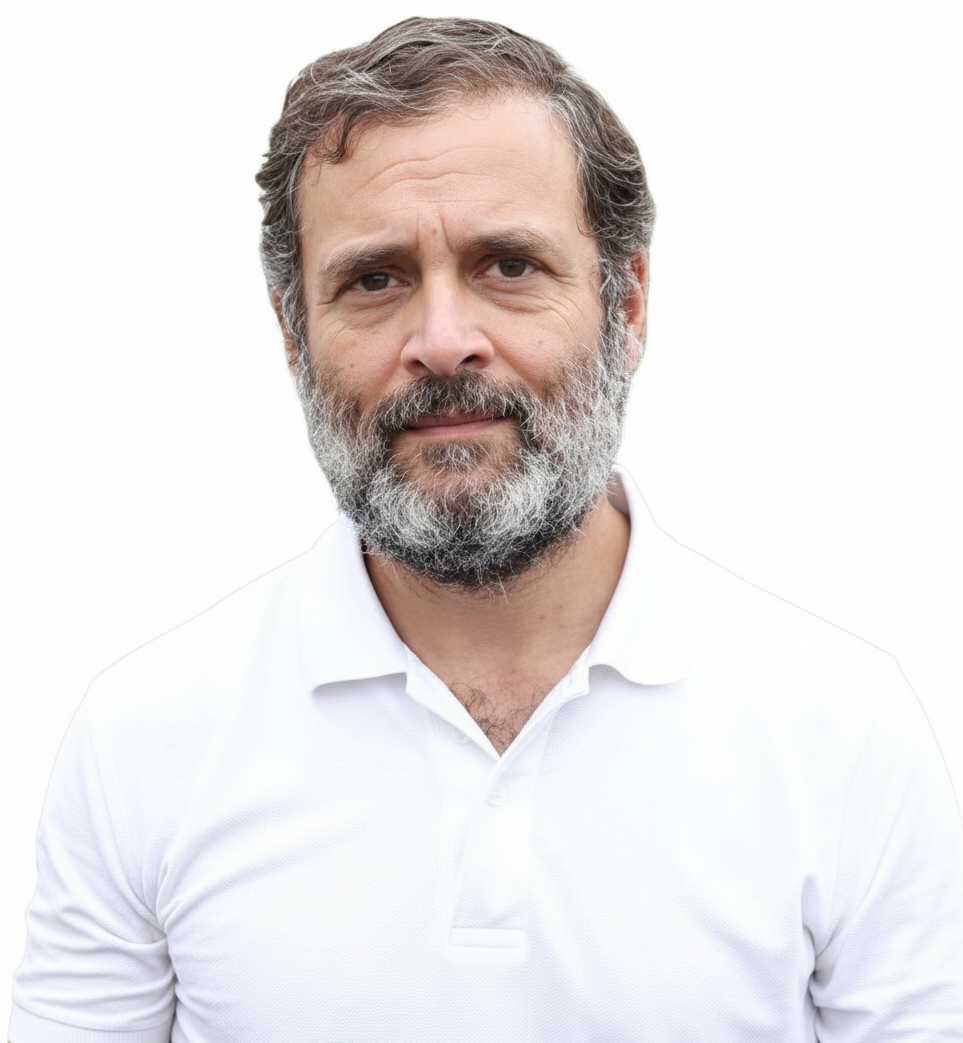
- Gandhi in 2024

12th Leader of the Opposition in Lok Sabha
- Incumbent
- Assumed office 9 June 2024
- Deputy: Gaurav Gogoi
- Speaker: Om Birla
- Preceded by: Sushma Swaraj (2014) (Note: This position was vacant from 26 May 2014 to 9 June 2024.) (Note: Succeeded Adhir Ranjan Chowdhury as Leader of INC in LS.)

Member of Parliament, Lok Sabha
- Incumbent
- Assumed office 4 June 2024
- Preceded by: Sonia Gandhi
- Constituency: Rae Bareli, Uttar Pradesh
- In office 7 August 2023 – 4 June 2024; 23 May 2019 – 23 March 2023
- Preceded by: M. I. Shanavas
- Succeeded by: Priyanka Gandhi Vadra
- Constituency: Wayanad, Kerala
- In office 17 May 2004 – 23 May 2019
- Preceded by: Sonia Gandhi
- Succeeded by: Smriti Irani
- Constituency: Amethi, Uttar Pradesh
Party political offices
President of the Indian National Congress
In office 16 December 2017 – 10 August 2019
Preceded by	Sonia Gandhi
Succeeded by	Sonia Gandhi (interim); Mallikarjun Kharge
Vice-President of the Indian National Congress
In office 19 January 2013 – 16 December 2017
President	Sonia Gandhi
Preceded by	Jitendra Prasada
General Secretary of Indian National Congress
In office 25 September 2007 – 19 January 2013
President	Sonia Gandhi
General Secretary of Indian Youth Congress
Incumbent
Assumed office 25 September 2007
Preceded by	Office established
General Secretary of National Students' Union of India
In office 25 September 2007 – 26 October 2022
Preceded by	Office established
Succeeded by	Mallikarjun Kharge

Personal details
- Born: Rahul Rajiv Gandhi; 19 June 1970 (age 56) New Delhi, Delhi, India
- Party: Indian National Congress
- Parents: Rajiv Gandhi (father); Sonia Gandhi (mother)
- Relatives: Priyanka Gandhi Vadra (sister); Nehru–Gandhi family
- Education: The Doon School; Rollins College (B.A.); Trinity College, Cambridge (MPhil)
- Website: Official website

Rahul Rajiv Gandhi (Hindi: [ˈraːɦʊl raːˈdʒiːʋ ˈɡaːndʱiː]; born 19 June 1970) is an Indian politician. A member of the Indian National Congress (INC), he currently serves as the 12th leader of the Opposition in Lok Sabha and as the member of the Lok Sabha for Rae Bareli, Uttar Pradesh, since June 2024. (Note: Top leadership of Congress decided that Gandhi will retain Rae Bareli in the 18th Lok Sabha and Priyanka Gandhi was announced as the Congress candidate for Wayanad bypoll.) (Note: Rahul Gandhi was selected as Leader of the Opposition in Lok Sabha by Indian National Developmental Inclusive Alliance on 25 June. But Lok Sabha Speaker recognised him as Leader of the Opposition in Lok Sabha effective since 9 June.) He previously represented the constituency of Wayanad, Kerala, from 2019 to 2024, and Amethi, Uttar Pradesh, from 2004 to 2019. Gandhi served as the party president of the Indian National Congress from December 2017 to July 2019.

A member of the Nehru–Gandhi political family, he spent his early years between Delhi and Dehradun, remaining largely outside the public sphere during his childhood and early youth. He received primary education in New Delhi and then attended The Doon School. However, due to security concerns, he was later home-schooled. Gandhi commenced his undergraduate degree at St. Stephen's College before moving to Harvard University. Following his father's assassination and subsequent security concerns, he moved to Rollins College in Florida, completing his degree in 1994. After earning a M.Phil. from Cambridge, Gandhi initiated his professional career with the Monitor Group, a management consulting firm in London. Soon thereafter, he returned to India and founded a technology outsourcing firm based in Mumbai. He ventured into politics in the 2000s, leading the Indian Youth Congress and National Students Union of India, while also being a trustee of the Rajiv Gandhi Foundation and Rajiv Gandhi Charitable Trust.

Ahead of the 2024 Indian general elections, Gandhi spearheaded the Bharat Jodo Yatra and the Bharat Jodo Nyay Yatra, contributing to the INC winning 99 seats and regaining the status of Official Opposition for the first time in a decade. Gandhi won the Rae Bareli Lok Sabha constituency in the 2024 elections and was nominated to serve as Leader of the Opposition.

== Early life and background ==
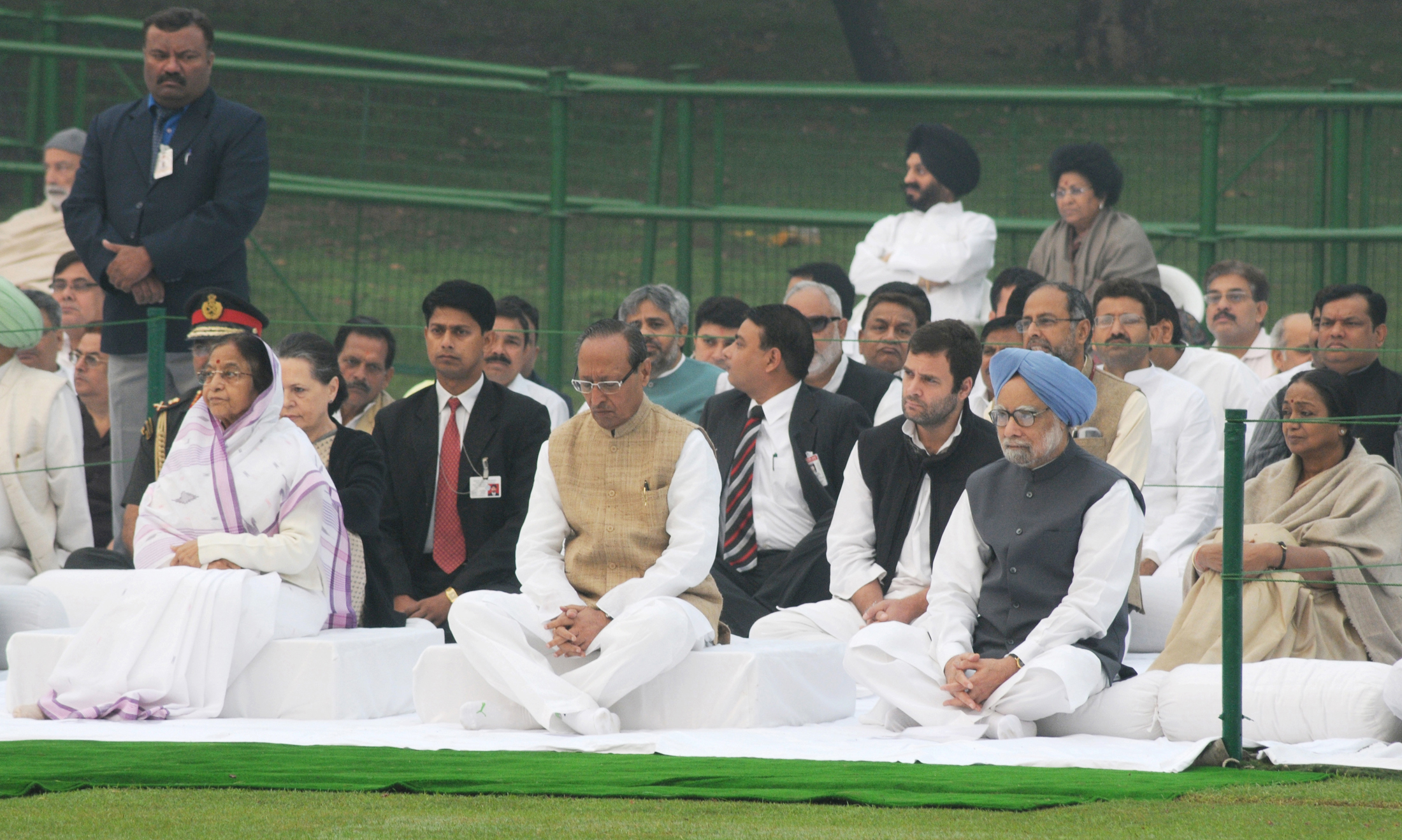
Gandhi along with Sonia Gandhi, then POI Pratibha Patil, then VPOI Hamid Ansari, then PM Manmohan Singh at the memorial of his grandmother Indira Gandhi

Rahul Rajiv Gandhi was born on 19 June 1970 at Holy Family Hospital in Delhi. He was the first of two children born to Rajiv Gandhi, who later served as the 6th prime minister of India, and Sonia Gandhi, who later served as the president of the Indian National Congress. He is the grandson of former prime minister Indira Gandhi and the great-grandson of India's first prime minister, Jawaharlal Nehru. His paternal grandfather, Feroze Gandhi was from Gujarat and was of Parsi descent.

Gandhi completed his elementary education at St. Columba's School in New Delhi. He then attended The Doon School in Dehradun (an elite all-boys' boarding school, also the alma mater of his father, Rajiv Gandhi) from 1981 to 1983. At Doon, Gandhi studied alongside notable contemporaries, including former Congress members Jyotiraditya Scindia and Jitin Prasada. Following the assassination of Indira Gandhi by Sikhs in her personal guard on 31 October 1984, his father entered politics and became the 6th prime minister of India. Due to security threats from Sikh extremists, Gandhi and his sister Priyanka were home-schooled, taking examinations under the supervision of teachers. Spending their childhood away from media attention, Gandhi and his sister kept low profiles, appearing with their parents at a handful of public occasions.

Gandhi joined St. Stephen's College, Delhi, an affiliated college of the University of Delhi, in 1989 for his undergraduate education. Gandhi's academic performance in Class XII, with a score of 61 per cent in the CBSE school certificate, was perceived as not particularly strong. He gained admission to St. Stephen's College for BA (Honors) History through the sports quota, which granted a 10 per cent advantage in exam scores to promising athletes; per National Rifle Association of India testimonials, Gandhi stood 4th in the 32nd National Shooting Competition held in New Delhi from 26 December 1988 to 5 January 1989. Gandhi had finished fourth in the Centre Fire Pistol 25 M (Indian Rule) Men's civilian event with a score of 371 out of 400 points. By July 1989, Gandhi had won eight national awards. In 1991, following the assassination of Rajiv Gandhi by the LTTE during an election rally, Gandhi left St. Stephen's and moved to Harvard University. Due to security concerns, he subsequently relocated to Rollins College in Florida. He further went on to obtain an Master of Philosophy (MPhil) in Development Studies, from Trinity College, Cambridge in 1995. Following his father and former prime minister Rajiv Gandhi's assassination in 1991, there was a heightened threat perception to the family, those closest to Gandhi were paranoid about his safety and might have forced him to take cover under the misleading surname "Vinci".

After completing higher education, Gandhi worked at the Monitor Group, a management consulting firm set up by Michael Porter of Harvard Business School, in London for three years. In 2002, he returned to India and established his technology consultancy, Backops Services Private Ltd, in Mumbai, where he served as one of the directors of the firm. Subsequently, he founded BackOps UK, a company that secured defence contracts from foreign suppliers.

== Political career ==
=== Formative years ===
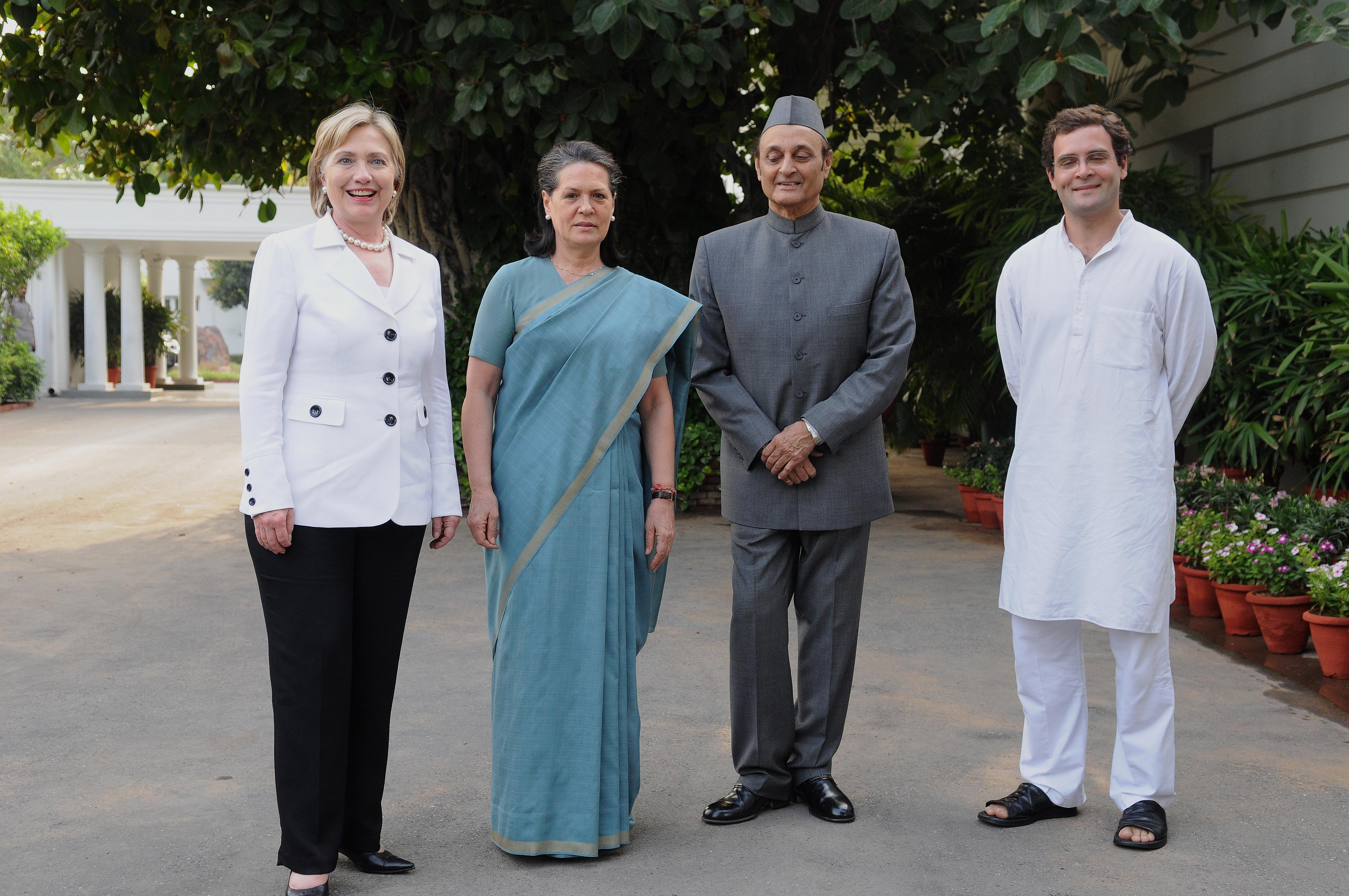
Rahul Gandhi (right) with Hillary Clinton, Sonia Gandhi, and Karan Singh in New Delhi, 2009

In March 2004, Gandhi announced his entry into politics by declaring that he would contest the 14th general elections from his father's former constituency of Amethi in Uttar Pradesh for the Lok Sabha, India's lower house of parliament. His mother had held the seat until she transferred to the neighbouring constituency of Rae Bareli. When Gandhi made this announcement, it came as a surprise to political commentators, who had perceived his sister Priyanka Gandhi as the more charismatic and probable successor. It generated speculation that the presence of a young member of India's most famous political family would reinvigorate the Congress party's political fortunes among India's youthful population. In his first interview with foreign media, Gandhi portrayed himself as a uniter of the country and condemned "divisive" politics in India, saying that he would try to reduce caste and religious tensions.

After being out of power for a record eight years, the Congress party returned to power, winning a total of 145 seats in the 2004 Indian general election. A coalition government was formed at the centre by Congress with the backing of regional parties. Gandhi secured a victory by a substantial margin of over 100,000 votes, thereby maintaining the stronghold of his family in Uttar Pradesh. The party performed poorly in Uttar Pradesh, as it held 10 out of the 80 Lok Sabha seats in the state, with a vote share of 12.53 per cent. Gandhi did not hold any official role or position within the government. From 2004 to 2006, Gandhi served as a member for the Standing Committee on Home Affairs. Between 2006 and 2009, he served as the member of the Standing Committee on Human Resource Development.

Gandhi and his sister, Priyanka, managed their mother's campaign for re-election to Rae Bareli in 2006, which was won with a margin of over 400,000 votes. He was a prominent figure in the Congress campaign for the 2007 Uttar Pradesh Legislative Assembly election; Congress did not perform well in those elections, winning 22 seats of the 403 seats with 8.53 per cent of the vote. On 24 September 2007, Gandhi was appointed as the general secretary of the All India Congress Committee, the governing body of the Congress party, as part of a reshuffle of the party secretariat. In the same reshuffle, he was also given charge of the Indian Youth Congress and the National Students Union of India.

For the 2009 Indian general election, Gandhi campaigned across India covering 22 states and 107 constituencies. His campaigning included addressing public rallies and meetings, interacting with voters, and highlighting the party's vision and agenda for the country. He specifically focused on issues such as rural development, education, employment, and women's empowerment. Gandhi, also emphasised the importance of youth participation in politics and urged them to be more involved in shaping the country's future. The nationwide elections defied the predictions made by pre-poll predictions and exit polls and gave a clear mandate to the incumbent, Congress-led United Progressive Alliance (UPA) government. The 2009 general elections were a success for the INC, which won 206 seats. While the Congress did not win a majority in the election, they emerged as the largest party and formed a coalition government with the support of other parties. Gandhi retained his Amethi seat by defeating his nearest rival by a margin of over 370,000 votes. Gandhi was credited with the Congress revival in Uttar Pradesh where they won 21 out of the total 80 Lok Sabha seats.

==== Youth politics ====
In September 2007, Gandhi was appointed as general secretary of the Indian Youth Congress (IYC), segment of the Congress party that represents the younger generation, and the National Students Union of India (NSUI), the faction that caters to the student community. As the general secretary of the Indian Youth Congress (IYC) and the National Students Union of India (NSUI), Gandhi played a notable role in shaping the policies and strategies of these organisations. After his appointment, both groups saw a significant increase in membership, from 200,000 to 2.5 million. The IYC underwent a restructuring process to make it more democratic and inclusive. In November 2008, Gandhi held interviews at his residence in New Delhi to handpick at least 40 people to make up the IYC's think tank. In 2009, during Gandhi's visit to West Bengal, the state unit of the Youth Congress registered 1 million members. Similarly, the IYC acquired around 10 to 15 new members per day in each assembly segment of Uttar Pradesh. After his visit, the number surged to 150 to 200 new members per day in the same regions.

While serving as the general secretary of the NSUI, Gandhi played an active role in strengthening the organisation and increasing student participation in politics. Under his leadership, the NSUI initiated programs and campaigns to address issues affecting the student community, such as the quality of education, employment opportunities, and social justice. Gandhi also advocated for greater student representation in decision-making processes and supported student leaders in their endeavours.

=== Congress leadership ===
Ahead of the 2014 Indian general election, Gandhi was named the vice-president of the Indian National Congress, effectively making him the party's second-in-command. Gandhi contested the 2014 Indian general election from his constituency, Amethi, and led the election campaign of the Indian National Congress. Gandhi retained the Amethi seat by defeating his nearest rival, BJP's Smriti Irani, by a margin of 107,000 votes. The Congress party suffered a massive defeat, winning 44 seats—its worst performance ever in the Lok Sabha elections. The UPA also had its worst-ever performance in elections and won 59 seats, compared to the 262 seats won in 2009. Following the defeat, Gandhi offered to resign from his positions which was rejected by the Congress Working Committee.

Gandhi led the 2019 election campaign of the Congress party. During campaign, Gandhi announced "Nyay" (Nyuntam Aay Yojana— Minimum Income Guarantee) Scheme promising Rs 6,000 each to 20 per cent poorest households to his election speeches. Gandhi also promised to fill 22 lakhs government jobs within one year coming to power at the Centre. Gandhi used the slogan "Chowkidar Chor Hai" as a jibe against Narendra Modi, BJP's prime ministerial candidate during his election rallies. The slogan was aimed at Modi about the alleged irregularities and favouritism in awarding the contracts for the Rafale fighter jet deal. Post election results the INC won 52 seats, eight more than the previous election. Its vote percentage once again fell below 20 per cent. Gandhi won the Wayanad seat with over 60 per cent vote share. He lost his existing seat of Amethi to Smriti Irani of the BJP by a margin of 55,120 votes.

Ahead of the 2024 Indian general elections, Gandhi spearheaded political initiatives, including the Bharat Jodo Yatra and the Bharat Jodo Nyay Yatra, which were designed to address pressing social and economic issues facing the country. These campaigns aimed to foster unity and counter divisive politics, while also enhancing the visibility of the Indian National Congress (INC) among voters. The INC secured 99 seats in the elections, representing an improvement from previous electoral performances and allowing the party to reclaim the status of Official Opposition for the first time in ten years. In the elections, Gandhi won the Rae Bareli constituency, succeeding his mother, Sonia Gandhi.

As a member of Parliament of India since 2004, Gandhi has served as a member of several parliamentary committees including Home Affairs, Human Resource Development, External Affairs, Ministry of Finance and Corporate Affairs and Defence.

=== Bharat Jodo Yatra ===
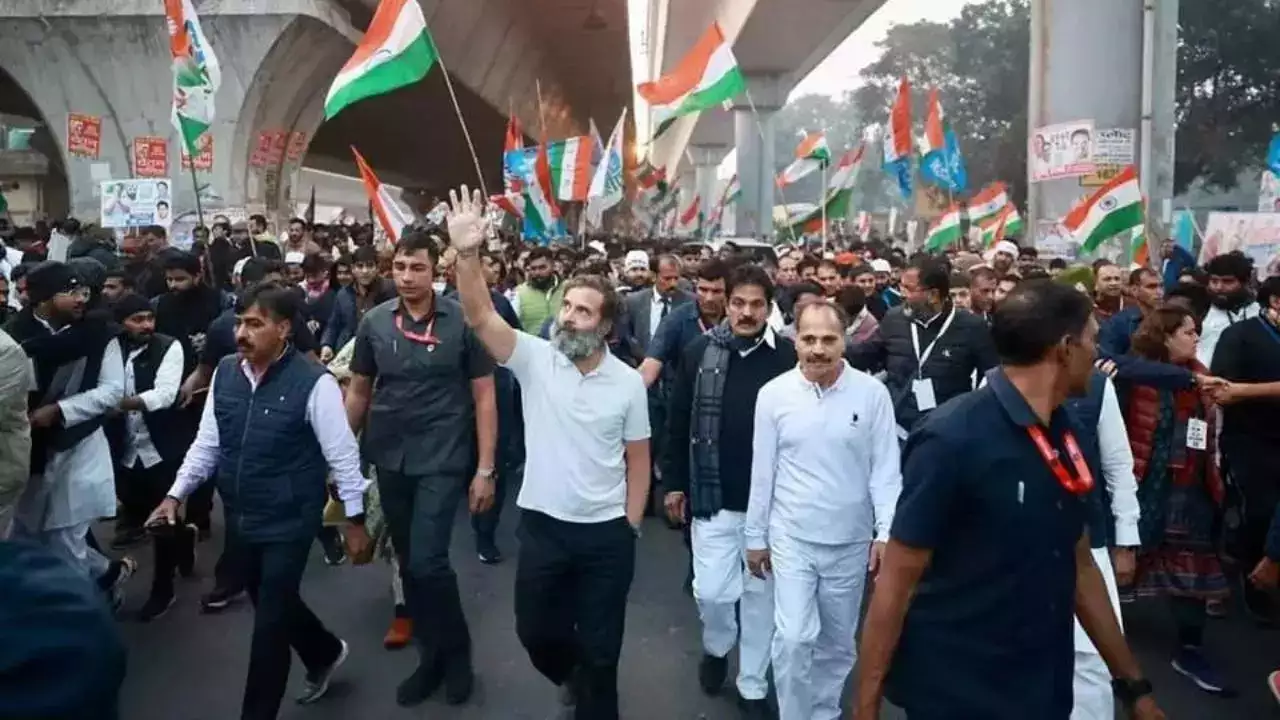
Gandhi during Bharat Jodo Yatra

The Bharat Jodo Yatra, which translates to "Unify India March," was a campaign organised by the Congress party spanning from 2022 to 2023 with the stated primary objective of promoting national unity and solidarity across the various regions of India. It aimed to mobilise support for the INC and its ideology, emphasising themes of patriotism, cultural heritage, and development. Gandhi started the initiative on 7 September 2022 at Kanyakumari. The yatra saw Gandhi along with INC leaders, including members of Parliament and notable personalities, travelling across the country, addressing rallies, conducting public meetings, and interacting with citizens. Throughout the yatra, Gandhi focused on issues such as economic development, social justice, and inclusive governance, aiming to strengthen the party's grassroots presence and reinvigorate its political relevance on the national stage.

The yatra concluded on 29 January 2023 with the unfurling of the tricolour flag at Lal Chowk, Srinagar; it lasted 137 days, covering 4,080 kilometres (2,540 mi) over nearly five months across 12 states and two union territories. During the yatra, the INC elected a new party president and also won a majority in the 2022 Himachal Pradesh Legislative Assembly election, the first majority the party had won by itself since 2018. In the subsequent elections in Karnataka and Telangana in 2023, the Congress party achieved a landslide victory, marked by an increase in both the party's vote share and the number of seats compared to the previous elections in the constituencies through which the march had passed.

==== Bharat Jodo Nyay Yatra ====
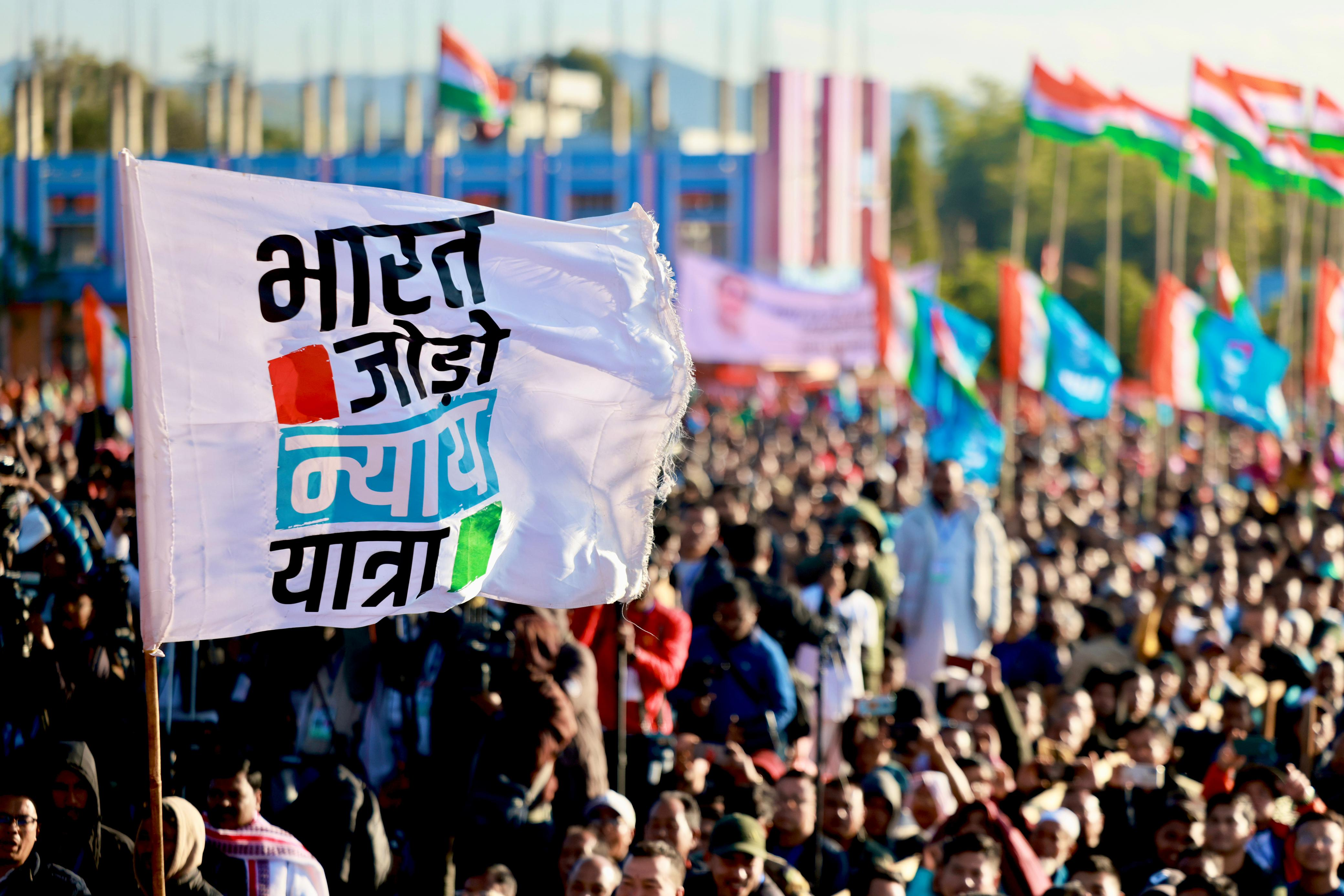
Attendees displaying banners at the Bharat Jodo Nyay Yatra gathering

From 14 January to 20 March 2024, Gandhi led a second yatra across India from east to west, the Bharat Jodo Nyay Yatra; unlike the previous version, the Yatra was conducted in a hybrid mode.

=== Disqualification ===
On 13 April 2019, during a political rally in Kolar, Karnataka, India before the 17th general election, Gandhi made a remark in Hindi, questioning, "Why do all these thieves have Modi as their surname? Nirav Modi, Lalit Modi, Narendra Modi." A speech comparing Narendra Modi with Fugitive Economic Offenders such as Nirav Modi and Lalit Modi. A criminal defamation case was filed by Purnesh Modi, a Bharatiya Janata Party (BJP) MLA from Surat West. He alleged that Gandhi had defamed all individuals with the surname Modi. On 16 July 2019, the Surat court excused Gandhi from appearing personally in court due to short notice. On 10 October, he pleaded not guilty in the Surat Court, recording his statements and responding to questions here on 24 June 2021, and again on 29 October. During these appearances, he clarified to the court that he did not intend to defame any community.

On 23 March 2023, Gandhi was convicted and sentenced to two years' imprisonment under charges of defamation. The day following the conviction, Utpal Kumar Singh, the Lok Sabha secretary general, announced that Rahul Gandhi would be disqualified as a member of parliament representing the Wayanad constituency, effective from 23 March, the date of his conviction. The secretary general further said that this action was taken under Section 8 of the Representation of the People Act, 1951 (RPA), which deals with the disqualification of convicted representatives in India. Rahul in his first press conference after his disqualification said that he is not Savarkar but Gandhi and Gandhis don't apologise. Gandhi's lawyer Abhishek Manu Singhvi appealed at the higher court and secured a one-month stay on the sentence. On 5 August, the Supreme Court of India issued a stay on Gandhi's conviction and sentence, handed down by Chief Judicial Magistrate in Surat on 23 March 2023.

The disqualification of Gandhi prompted widespread reactions and responses, from the Congress party as well as other opposition leaders and lawmakers abroad. Legal experts questioned the basis of the charge, as defamation is only actionable against individuals and not a generic class of people. The US House of Representatives, Ro Khanna, Democrat co-chair of the India Caucus, described the removal of Gandhi from parliament as a "deep betrayal" of India's "deepest values". A spokesperson for Germany's foreign ministry stated that Berlin had "acknowledged" the verdict and was monitoring the subsequent steps, including the possibility of an appeal and whether the "suspension of his mandate" was deemed justified. US Senator Chris Van Hollen made a separate comment, stating that the news of the disqualification was "alarming".

=== Leader of the Opposition in Lok Sabha (2024–present) ===
Following the 2024 general election, he was appointed as the Leader of the Opposition in Lok Sabha, reinforcing his role as a prominent figure within the party and the opposition landscape. In his first year in the role, he made 16 speeches in the 18th Lok Sabha, and pressured the government to conduct a nationwide caste census; this was adopted by the government in April 2025, as announced by the Union Railway Minister Ashwini Vaishnaw. Gandhi welcomed the decision, calling it "the first step towards deep social reform". He supported the 2026 Delhi Jantar Mantar protests, being forcibly removed and detained by police during a demonstration on 21 July.

==== 2025 vote theft allegations ====
In August 2025, Gandhi alleged irregularities in voter rolls and polling processes, referring to the issue as "vote chori" ("vote theft"), during a press conference on 7 August. He cited examples from constituencies including Mahadevapura in Karnataka and presented documents which he said showed duplicate and fraudulent voter entries. The Election Commission of India subsequently asked him to provide formal evidence supporting the claims or to withdraw them. Later in the month, Gandhi expanded the allegations to cover multiple parliamentary constituencies and took part in public demonstrations organised by the Indian National Congress on the issue.

== Political positions ==
=== National security ===
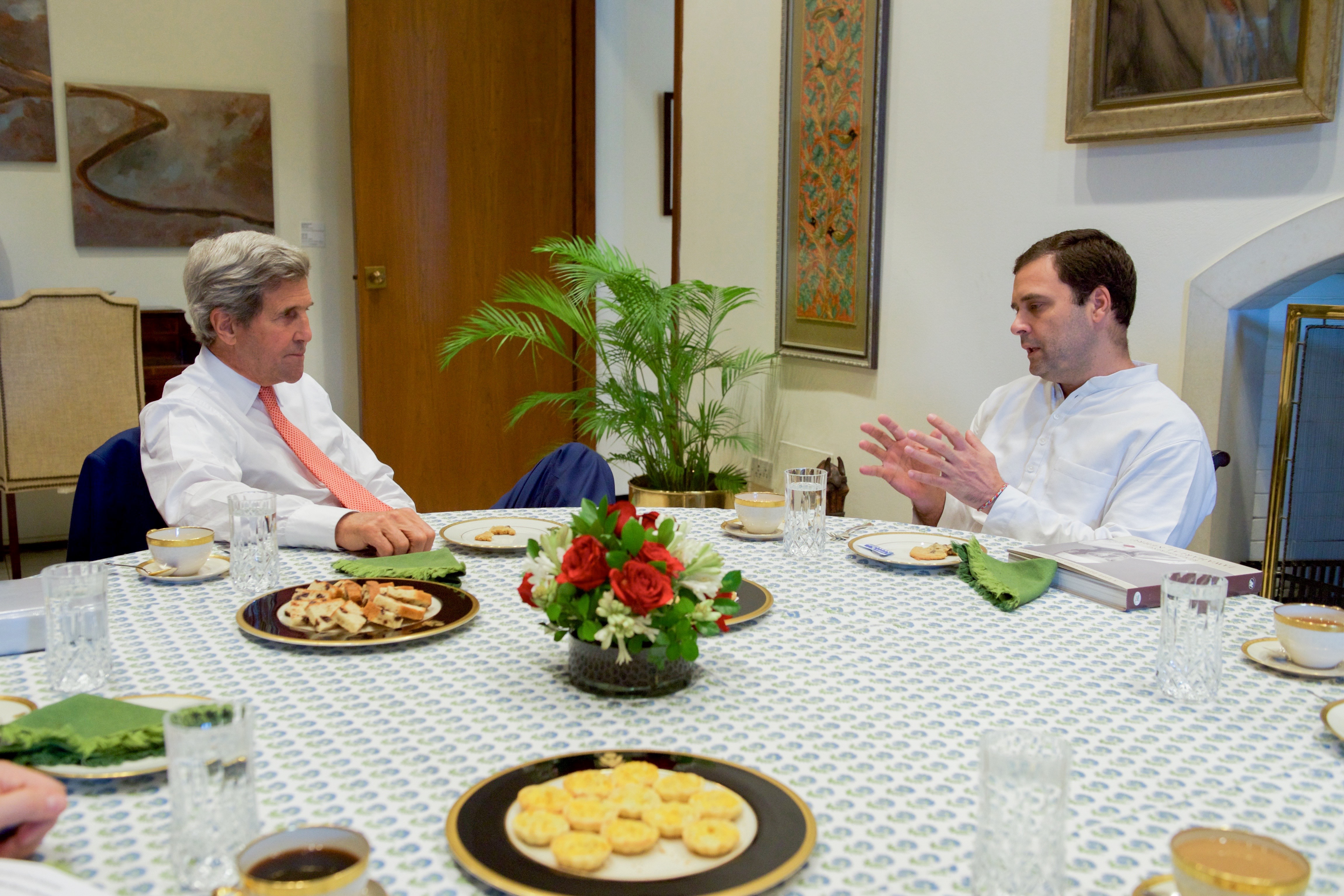
U.S. Secretary of State John Kerry with Gandhi at the Roosevelt House in New Delhi in 2016

In December 2010, during the United States diplomatic cables leak, WikiLeaks leaked a cable dated 3 August 2009 after Prime Minister Manmohan Singh had hosted a lunch on 20 July 2009 for Gandhi, then the general secretary of the AICC. One of the guests who was invited for the lunch was the United States ambassador to India, Timothy J. Roemer. In a "candid conversation" with Roemer, he said that he believes Hindu extremists pose a greater threat to his country than Muslim militants. Gandhi referred specifically to more-polarising figures in the Bharatiya Janata Party (BJP). Also responding to the ambassador's query about the activities in the region by the Islamist militant organisation Lashkar-e-Taiba (LeT), Gandhi said there was evidence of some support for the group among certain elements in India's indigenous Muslim population. In a response to this, the BJP heavily criticised Gandhi for his statements. BJP spokesperson Ravi Shankar Prasad slammed Gandhi, saying that his language was a bigger threat to India, dividing the people of the country on communal grounds. Speaking to reporters, Prasad said, "In one stroke Mr. Rahul Gandhi has sought to give a big leverage to the propaganda to all the extremist and terrorist groups in Pakistan and also some segments of the Pakistani establishment. It would also seriously compromise India's fight against terror as also our strategic security." Adding that terrorism has no religion, he claimed that Rahul Gandhi had shown his lack of understanding India. Gandhi has also been critical of groups like the RSS and has compared them to terrorist organisations like SIMI.

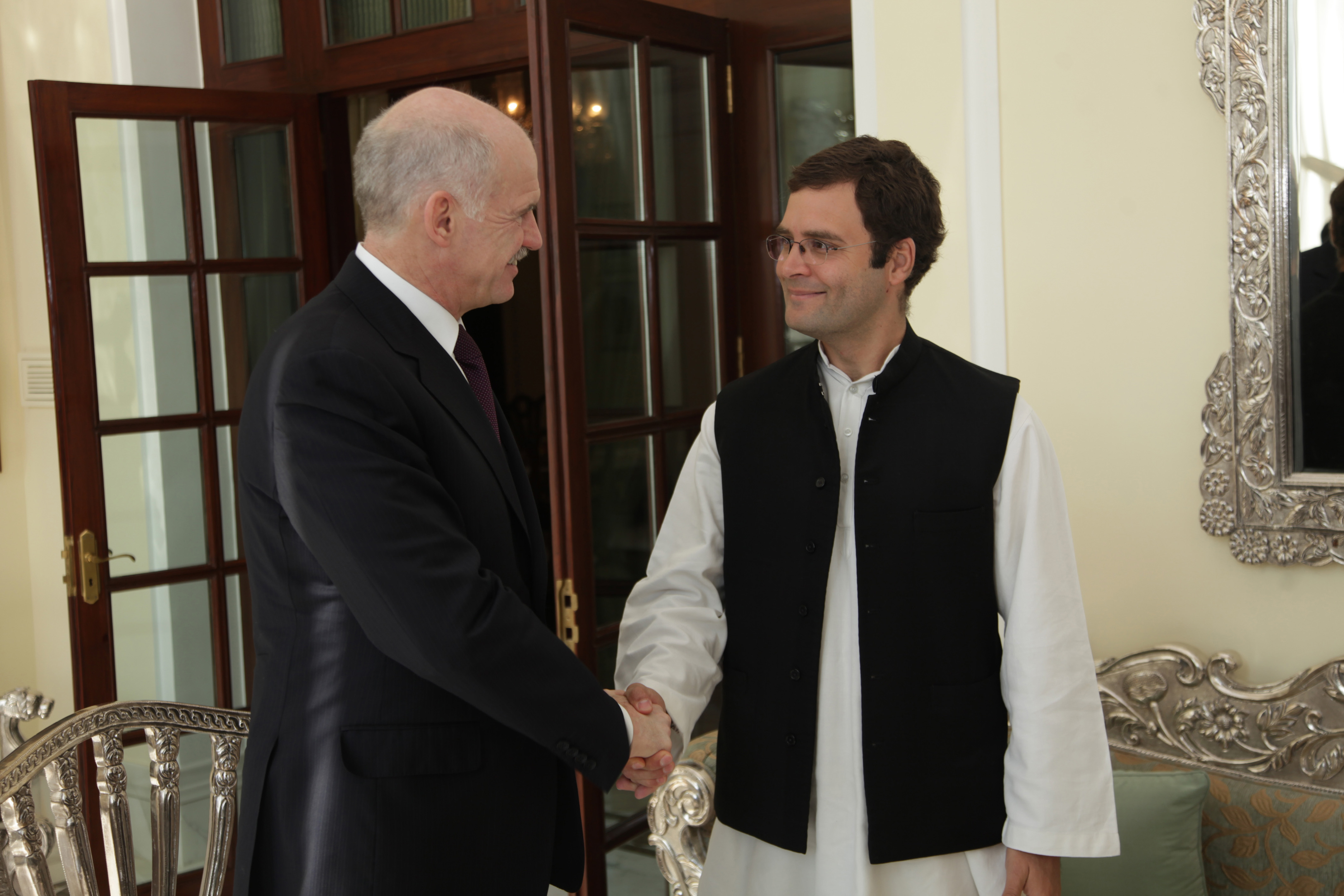
Gandhi with Greek prime minister George Papandreou in Chanakyapuri, New Delhi

After the 2013 Muzaffarnagar riots at a Madhya Pradesh election rally in Indore, Gandhi claimed that a police officer told him that Pakistan's military intelligence service, ISI, was trying to recruit disgruntled riot-affected youngsters. The district administration, Uttar Pradesh state government, Union Home Ministry, Research and Analysis Wing (RAW) and Intelligence Bureau (IB) denied any such development. This remark drew heavy criticism from various political outfits such as BJP, SP, CPI and JD(U). Congress's Jairam Ramesh said Gandhi needed to apologise to the Muslim community for this remark. In reply to the ECI's show-cause notice to explain why action should not be initiated against him for violating the Model Code of Conduct, Gandhi said that he did not intend to exploit communal sentiments but was referring to divisive politics.

Gandhi famously said on 28 August 2019 that Kashmir is an internal matter of India and there is no room for any foreign interference on this. He also criticised Pakistan for instigating violence and supporting terrorism in Kashmir.

Gandhi was approached by a Pakistani student in November 2026, while participating in a dialogue at the University of Chicago, moderated by a political science professor Robert Pape. The student asked Gandhi whether India and Pakistan could put the "blame game" behind and work together. Gandhi said that Pakistan's support for terrorism in India remained the main obstacle and later said that "Until the support for terrorism is over, talks cannot be help between the nations.".

=== Lokpal ===
Gandhi opines that the Lokpal should be made a constitutional body and it should be made accountable to the Parliament, just like the Election Commission of India. He opined that Lokpal alone cannot root out corruption, rather a strong political will is needed to remove corruption. This statement came out on 25 August 2011, on the 10th day of Anna Hazare's fast. Gandhi's statement was considered a delaying tactic by the opposition and Team Anna's members. It was consequently slammed by opposition leaders Sushma Swaraj and Arun Jaitley. The Parliamentary Standing Committee led by Abhishek Manu Singhvi tabled the Jan Lokpal Bill report in the Rajya Sabha on 9 December 2011. The report recommended the Lokpal be made into a constitutional body.

=== Farmers and land agitation ===
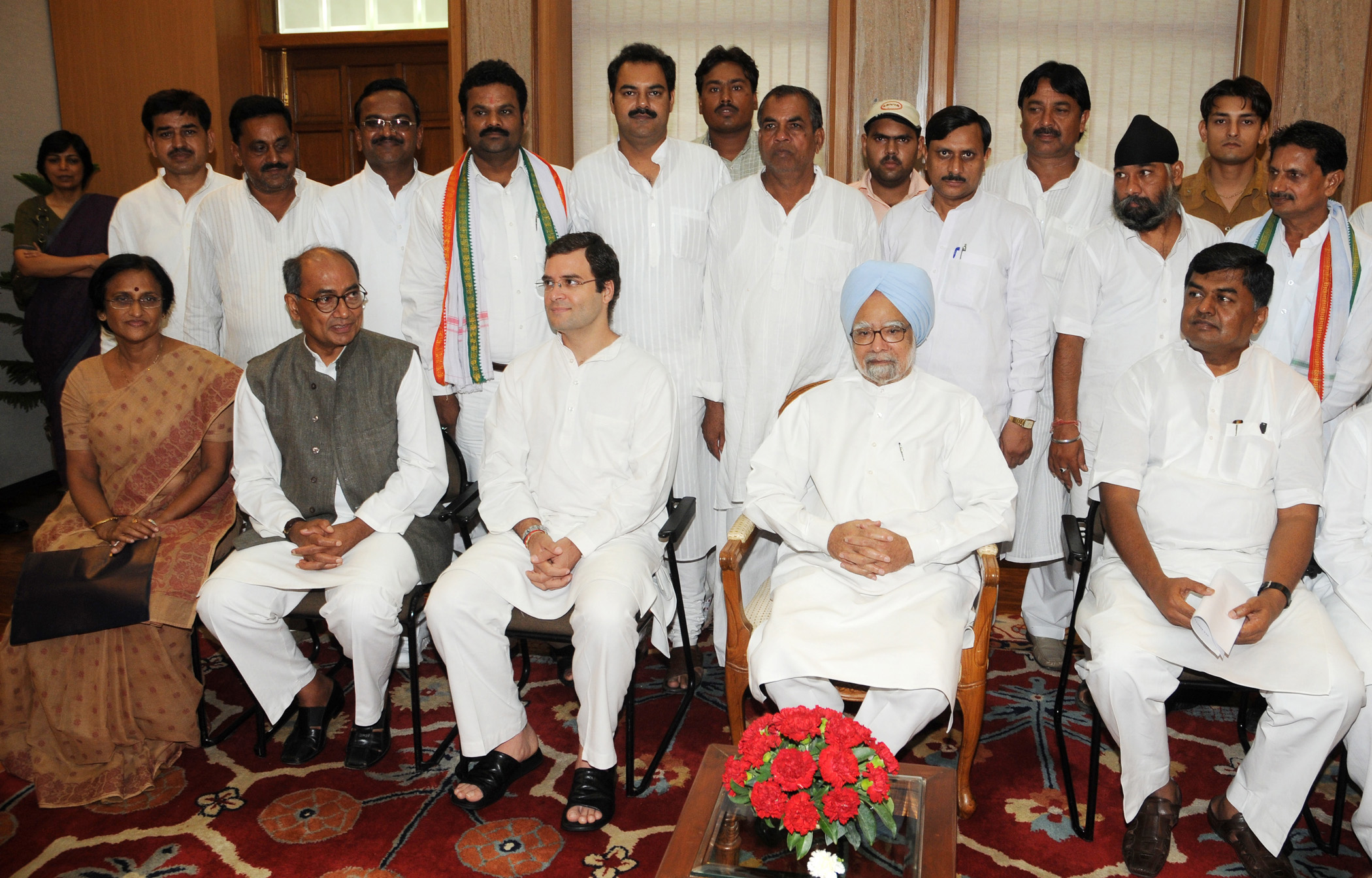
Former Prime Minister Manmohan Singh sits next to Gandhi who leads a delegation of leaders from Bundelkhand region in New Delhi. 2009

On 19 April 2015, Gandhi addressed the farmer and worker's rally, named as Kisan Khet Mazdoor Rally in Ramlila Maidan. Here he made "references to his agitations in Niyamgiri in Orissa and Bhatta-Parsaul in Greater Noida in Uttar Pradesh". The rally was attended by 100,000 people. In the speech he gave, he criticised the Indian prime minister Narendra Modi about his comment in Toronto where he said that he was "cleaning the mess created by previous governments". He also said, "Do you know how Modi won the election?... He borrowed thousands of crores from industrialists for his several campaigns and advertisements. How will he pay them back? He will pay them back with your land. He will give your land to his industrialist friends."

He razzed the government as a "suit-boot government", a reference to Modi's monogrammed suit which he wore in the Republic Day meeting with Barack Obama. Moreover, he used the "acche din government" jibe (which was Modi's election campaign slogan meaning "good days government") and mentioned that it had "failed the country".

A land bill was introduced by the BJP government in the parliament in May which was criticised by the opposition parties. Accusing the government of "murdering" UPA's land bill, Gandhi promised to prevent the bill from being passed, if not in the parliament then would "stop you [BJP government] on streets". He further accused the government of diluting the bill and called it "anti-farmer". Gandhi also drew a parallel between "daylight robbery" and the bill. On 26 May, the day of the Modi government's first anniversary, Gandhi commented at a rally in Kozhikode "Unfortunately, birthday celebrations is only for a few powerful friends of the government. Kisan, farmers and mazdoor have nothing to celebrate."

=== Women's empowerment and LGBTQ rights ===
"India will be truly successful only when women occupy equal space in our society. They must take their rightful place in politics and shape India's destiny."

— Gandhi's remarks on Women empowerment

Gandhi has spoken publicly about the importance of women's empowerment and gender equality in India. While inaugurating 'Utsaah', a Kerala Mahila Congress convention in Kochi, Gandhi stated that the Congress party would actively promote women within its organizational structure and set a target to have 50 per cent of women as chief ministers within the next 10 years. Gandhi initiated the Self-Help Groups among the women in the villages of Amethi. The primary focus of this scheme was to bring women together and empower them with information and decision making capabilities. He has called for increased representation of women in politics and for the eradication of gender-based violence. Under the second Manmohan Singh ministry, a Women's Reservation Bill to require that a third of Lok Sabha and state legislative assembly seats be reserved for women was introduced in the Rajya Sabha. Gandhi backed the bill, stating, "Women do not need any protection. If you give them their rights, they can protect themselves". This bill passed the Rajya Sabha on 9 March 2010, it never received a vote in the Lok Sabha and eventually lapsed due to its pending status. In 2019, while addressing students in Chennai, Gandhi again called for 33 per cent reservation of all parliamentary Lok Sabha and state legislative assembly seats for women, as well as government jobs.

On 6 September 2018, the Supreme Court of India revoked Section 377 of the Indian Penal Code, an act which criminalised homosexual sex between adults. Gandhi supported this move, stating that he believed that issues related to personal freedom should be left to the individual. He opined that it is essential to uphold the constitutional guarantee of life and liberty to all citizens of India. Under Gandhi's leadership, the Congress appointed a transgender woman as national general secretary in the women's wing—seen as a step toward mainstreaming transgender individuals.

On 14 December 2019, Gandhi during the Bharat Bachao Rally at Ramlila Maidan famously declared that he is not Rahul Savarkar but Rahul Gandhi and he won't apologise for speaking the truth amid BJP demands for an apology for his earlier "Rape in India" remark.

=== Climate and energy ===
Gandhi advocates the transition to renewable energy sources and has called for increased investment in solar, wind, and other sustainable energy technologies. He has been very concerned about the environmental degradation of the world and has said that unless environmental problems are made a political issue, they will not get the attention they deserve.

Gandhi criticised the Environment Impact Assessment (EIA) 2020 draft by calling it "dangerous" and said that its long-term consequences will be harmful. Calling it a disaster, he said that it will silence the communities who will be directly impacted by environmental degradation.

=== Economy ===
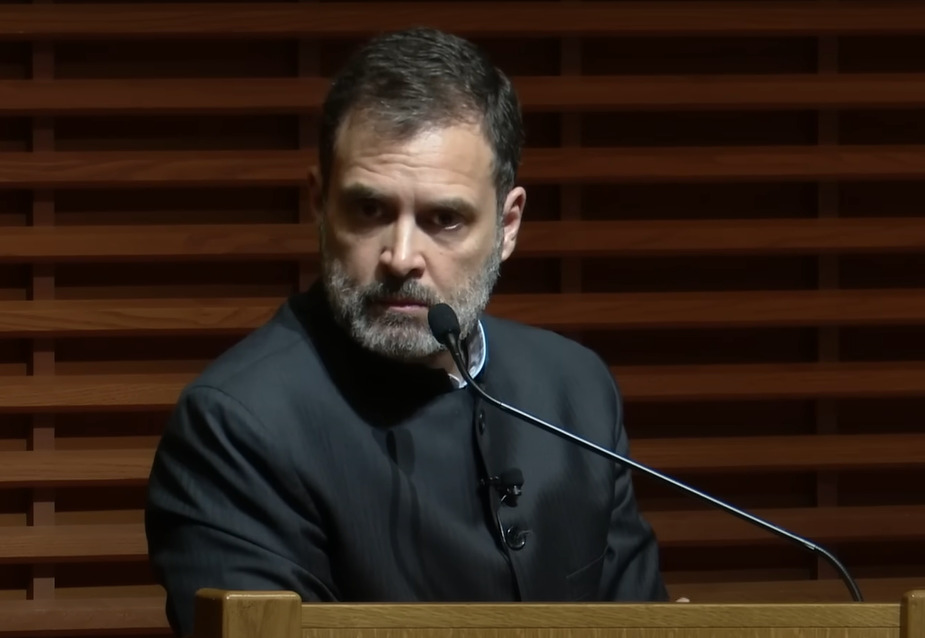
Gandhi, at Stanford University in May 2023, delivers address on India's democracy and the United States' relationship.

Gandhi while addressing All India Congress Committee (AICC) in Jaipur, called for an end to red tape and outdated laws that slow job creation. Gandhi views the economic policies of Modi Government as fundamentally to benefit the two to three billionaires and has described them as crony capitalists. Calling the "crony capitalists" as best friends of Modi, he has been critical of the privatisation of government assets. He is of the view that RSS and crony capitalists are colluding to control India. He has been specifically harsh on Indian billionaire Gautam Adani, to whom he said the Modi Government has been very favourable. He sees the rise of Adani as a direct consequence of crony capitalism. He said that he is not anti-business and supports fairness. Disagreeing with privatisation of PSUs, he said that Congress will not allow the privatisation if it comes to power. Citing the report on inequality by Oxfam, he said that rising economic inequality is the result of Modi Government's economic policies.

==== Demonetisation ====
Gandhi has been very critical of the Modi government's demonetisation of ₹500 and ₹1,000 banknotes of the Mahatma Gandhi Series. He has called it a "tragedy" and a "disaster" that has negatively impacted the Indian economy and the lives of ordinary citizens. Gandhi has also accused the government of carrying out the policy without adequate planning and causing immense hardship to the poor and vulnerable sections of society. He said that demonetisation is a fundamental failure of policy design and has alleged that it was a deliberate move by "PayPM" to help two to three billionaires to monopolise the economy. Terming demonetisation as the country's "biggest scam".

During his public speeches and political rallies, Gandhi has consistently criticised the demonetisation move, claiming that it failed to achieve its intended objectives of combating black money and curbing corruption. He has also argued that the policy was implemented without proper consultation with experts or the opposition parties. Gandhi further asserted that, demonetisation caused significant disruption to farmers, and rendered millions jobless in small and medium-sized businesses, and workers in the informal sector.

=== Minority rights and historical accountability ===
Speaking at the Watson Institute for International and Public Affairs at Brown University in April 2025, Rahul Gandhi addressed the history of the Indian National Congress and specifically accepted responsibility for the anti-Sikh riots of 1984. Stating that "what happened in the 80s was wrong," Gandhi noted that many of the party's mistakes occurred before his political career, but added that he was "more than happy to take responsibility for everything that the Congress party has ever done wrong in its history," while highlighting his visits to the Golden Temple. The remarks drew criticism from Bharatiya Janata Party leaders, who questioned the sincerity of the statement.

==== Position on Gaza and diplomatic relations ====
Rahul Gandhi has expressed support for the rights of the Palestinian people and strongly criticised Israel's military actions in the Gaza Strip. He expressed concern over the deaths of Palestinian civilians, including children, and restrictions on essential resources such as food, water and electricity in Gaza. However, he also condemned Hamas's attacks on Israeli civilians and the taking of hostages, describing such acts as wrong. He called for an end to the cycle of violence between Israel and Palestine.

Despite criticising Israeli military actions in Gaza, Rahul Gandhi explained why India and Israel have strategic relations, particularly in the area of defence cooperation. During a discussion at the University of Chicago on 19 November 2026, he noted that India purchases weapons from Israel and argued that maintaining such relations was in India's national interest. He argued that India's foreign policy should be guided by its own national interests and that no country, including Israel, United States, Russia or China, should prevent India from playing its rightful role on the global stage. Therefore, even though India may have strategic relations with certain countries, if the actions of those countries are inappropriate, India should be able to be vocal in its criticism.

== Personal life ==
Gandhi is reticent about discussing his private and personal life. He is a Hindu and has discussed practising Vipassana meditation. Gandhi is known to have trained in the martial arts, particularly aikido and jiu jitsu.

Rahul serves in Parliament alongside his mother Sonia and sister Priyanka. He and his sister are the only sibling duo serving together in the 18th Lok Sabha.

== Electoral history ==
Year	Constituency	Party	Votes	%	Opponent		Result	Margin
2004	Amethi	INC	390,179	66.18%	BSP	Chandra Parkash Mishra	Won	290,853
2009	Amethi	INC	464,195	71.78%	BSP	Asheesh Shukla	Won	370,198
2014	Amethi	INC	408,651	46.71%	BJP	Smriti Irani	Won	107,903
2019	Amethi	INC	413,394	43.86%	BJP	Smriti Irani	Lost	55,120
2019	Wayanad	INC	706,367	64.67%	CPI	P. P. Suneer	Won	431,770
2024	Wayanad	INC	647,445	59.69%	CPI	Annie Raja	Won	364,422
2024	Rae Bareli	INC	687,649	66.17%	BJP	Dinesh Pratap Singh	Won	390,030

== Positions held ==
=== Public offices ===
In 2004, the Gandhi was elected to the 14th Lok Sabha and served as a member of the Standing Committee on Home Affairs from 2004 to 2006, as well as a member of the Standing Committee on Human Resource Development from 2006 to 2009. In 2009, they were re-elected to the 15th Lok Sabha for a second term and served as a member of the Standing Committee on Human Resource Development, along with being a member of the Consultative Committee on Rural Development.

In 2014, Gandhi was elected to the 16th Lok Sabha for a third term and served as a member of the Standing Committee on External Affairs, as well as a member of the Consultative Committee on Ministry of Finance and Corporate Affairs. In 2019, he was elected to the 17th Lok Sabha for a fourth term and served as a member of the Standing Committee on Defence, as well as a member of the Consultative Committee for the Ministry of External Affairs.

In 2024, Gandhi was elected to the 18th Lok Sabha for a fifth term and serves as the 12th Leader of the opposition in Lok Sabha, as well as a member of the Standing Committee on Defence.

Year	Description
2004	Elected to 14th Lok Sabha: Member, Standing Committee on Home Affairs (2004–06); Member, Standing Committee on Human Resource Development (2006–09)
2009	Elected to 15th Lok Sabha (2nd term): Member, Standing Committee on Human Resource Development; Member, Consultative Committee on Rural Development
2014	Elected to 16th Lok Sabha (3rd term): Member, Standing Committee on External Affairs; Member, Consultative Committee on Ministry of Finance and Corporate Affairs
2019	Elected to 17th Lok Sabha (4th term): Member, Standing Committee on Defence; Member, Consultative Committee, Ministry of External Affairs
2024	Elected to 18th Lok Sabha (5th term): 12th Leader of the opposition in Lok Sabha; Member, Standing Committee on Defence

=== Within party ===
Between 2008 and 2013, Gandhi assumed the role of general secretary within the Indian National Congress (INC). Since 2007, Gandhi has served as the General Secretary of both the Indian Youth Congress and the National Students' Union of India (NSUI), positions he established and of which he currently holds of Indian Youth Congress. His tenure as vice-president of the INC, established in 2013, lasted until 2016, after which the position was abolished. Subsequently, from 2017 to 2019, Gandhi served as the president of the INC, succeeding Sonia Gandhi.

Year	Position	Preceded by	Succeeded by
2008–2013	General secretary of INC	N/A (Note: Multi-members position typically appointed by the party president)	N/A (Note: Multi-members position typically appointed by the party president)
2007–Incumbent	General Secretary of Indian Youth Congress	Position established	Incumbent
2007–2022	General Secretary of NSUI	Position established	Mallikarjun Kharge
2013–2016	Vice-president of INC	Jitendra Prasada	Position abolished
2017–2019	President of INC	Sonia Gandhi	Sonia Gandhi (interim); Mallikarjun Kharge

== See also ==
- Indian National Developmental Inclusive Alliance – Indian big tent political coalition led by the INC
- Indian Youth Congress – Youth wing of the Indian National Congress
- List of presidents of the Indian National Congress – Chief executives of the INC
- National Students' Union of India – Indian National Congress student wing

== Notes ==
Political offices
Preceded by Sushma Swaraj	Leader of the Opposition in Lok Sabha; 09 June 2024	Incumbent
Party political offices
Preceded by Sonia Gandhi	President; Indian National Congress; 2017–2019	Succeeded by Sonia Gandhi
Lok Sabha
Preceded by Sonia Gandhi	Member of Parliament for Amethi; 2004–2019	Succeeded by Smriti Irani
Preceded by M. I. Shanavas	Member of Parliament for Wayanad; 2019–2024	Succeeded by Priyanka Gandhi Vadra
Preceded by Sonia Gandhi	Member of Parliament for Rae Bareli; 2024–present	Incumbent
