= Gurdeep Singh Sappal =

Indian politician

All India Congress Committee (I/C) Administration
- Incumbent
- Assumed office 23 December 2023
- Preceded by: Pawan Kumar Bansal

Personal details
- Party: Indian National Congress

Gurdeep Singh Sappal is an Indian politician from the Indian National Congress. He is a permanent member of the Congress Working Committee (CWC), which is the highest decision-making body of the party. He is also the administration in-charge at the All India Congress Committee (AICC), heading the party's administrative affairs.

He is an advisor to Mallikarjun Kharge, the national president of Congress and is coordinator of office of the Congress president. He also represents the party in media as a spokesperson.

He is the member of the campaign committee of I.N.D.I.A.(aka I.N.D.I.A), which is empowered to plan and execute the joint campaign of opposition parties for the national general elections (Lok Sabha Election) scheduled in 2024.

He is the former chief executive officer and Editor-in-Chief of Rajya Sabha TV, the public broadcaster owned and operated by Rajya Sabha, the Upper House of The Parliament of India. He was the Officer on Special Duty to the Vice President of India and worked as his aide and political advisor.

Sappal is credited with conceptualizing and establishing Rajya Sabha Television (RSTV). He has also conceptualized and produced a ten-part television series Samvidhaan - The Making of the Constitution of India, which re-enacts the debates of the Constituent Assembly and recreates the drama of the political and parliamentary process of developing the salient features of the Constitution of India. The series was directed by Shyam Benegal. He also conceptualised and produced feature film Raagdesh for RSTV, directed by Tigmanshu Dhulia.

Gurdeep Sappal was the Chief Executive Editor and Editor-in-Chief of Swaraj Express, a 24x7 Hindi news satellite channel between 2018 and 2020.

Gurdeep Singh Sappal was appointed as a member of Empowered Action Group of Leaders and Experts (EAGLE) which was constituted by Indian National Congress to monitor the conduct of free and fair elections by the Election Commission of India on 2 February 2025.

== Project ==
Sappal's last film project was Raagdesh. It is a cinematic rendition of the famous Red Fort Trials of the Indian National Army's Azad Hind Fauz. The trials were held in 1945 by the British Government, who charged Lt. Col Gurubaksh Singh Dhillon, Major General Shah Nawaz Khan and Lt. Col. Prem Sahgal with charges of acting against the King of Britain and murder. The three were the main associates of Netaji Subhash Chandra Bose. The film was conceptualized by Sappal, is directed by Tigmanshu Dhulia.

== Career ==
Sappal started his career as Senior Research Fellow in Council for Scientific and Technology Research (CSIR), where he worked on Information Systems for Mlti Sectoral Rural Development. He also worked for inconclusive Ph.D. in Information Systems at IIT, Delhi. Thereafter, he worked on several research projects in rural technology development, District Primary Education Programme, Sarva Shiksha Abhiyan and child labour. He was also an active participant in adult literacy and post-literacy campaigns.

He has also worked as aide to Suresh Pachauri, Minister of State for Personnel and Parliamentary Affairs from 2004 - 2007, in the UPA 1 government. Thereafter, he was associated with the election of the President of India and Vice President of India in 2007. He was the main coordinator for the election campaign of Mohammad Hamid Ansari, who went on to become the Vice President of India for two successive terms, i.e. 2007-2012 and 2012–2017. After taking office in August 2007, the Vice President of India Hamid Ansari chose him as his main advisor for political and parliamentary work and appointed him as the Officer on Special Duty. The association lasted for the entire two terms of Sh. Ansari as the Vice President of India. In 2008, Rajya Sabha decided to start its own 24x7 TV channel. The efforts to begin the channel were frustrated due to various reasons for the next three years. In 2011, the decision was taken to hand over the reins of the proposed channel to Sappal, who was given the additional task of the CEO, RSTV. Within months of taking the charge, he started limited broadcast of the channel on 26 August 2011. Subsequently, it became a 24x7 channel on 26 January 2012.

== Controversies ==
Sappal and RSTV faced criticism on Twitter for declining to telecast Yoga Day in June 2015. It was a false charge and was answered to by Sappal, who was supported by the mainstream media.
