= List of Communist Party of India (Marxist) candidates in the 2014 Indian general election =

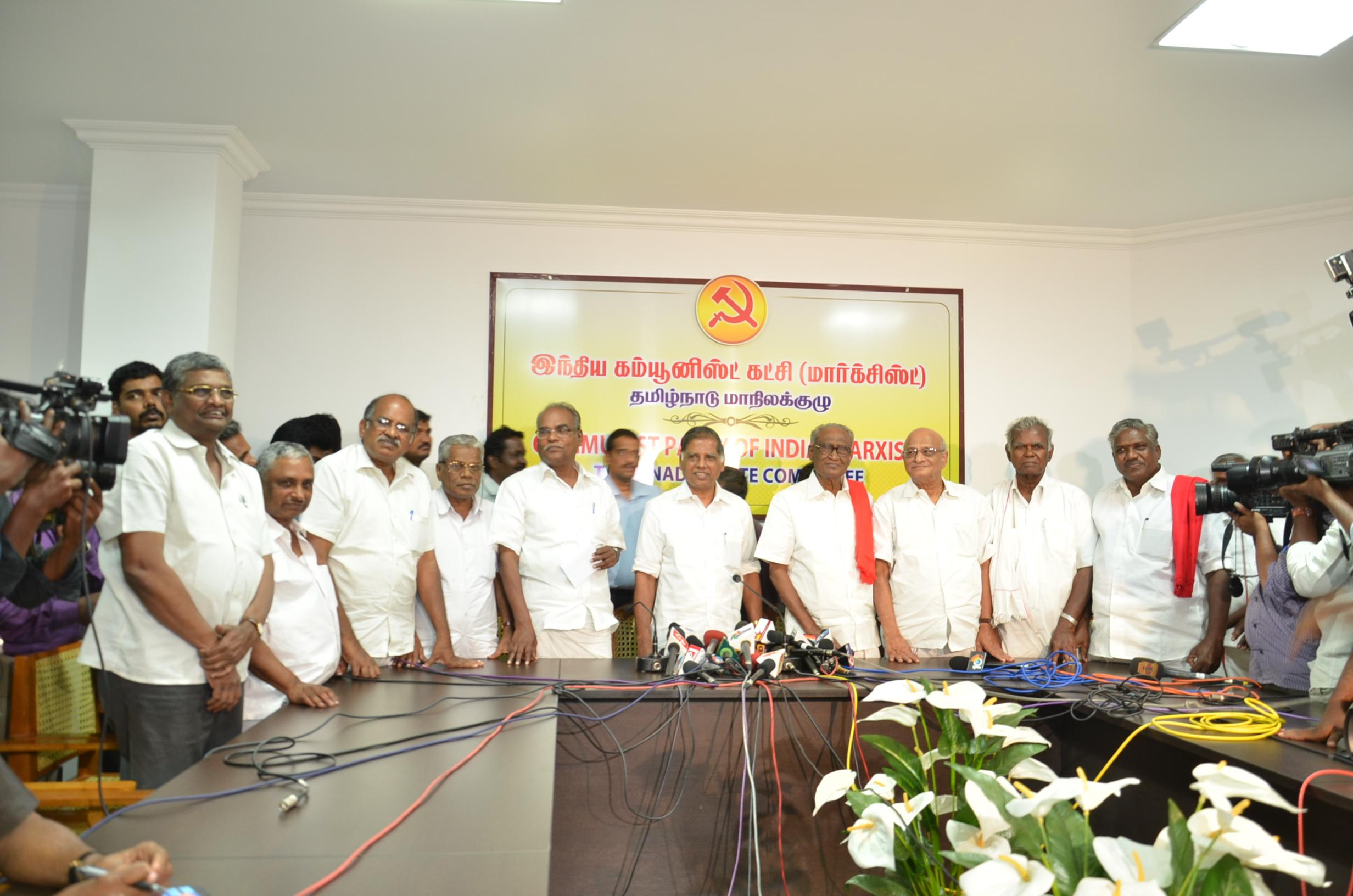
Joint press conference of CPI(M) and CPI leaders in Tamil Nadu, March 6, 2014

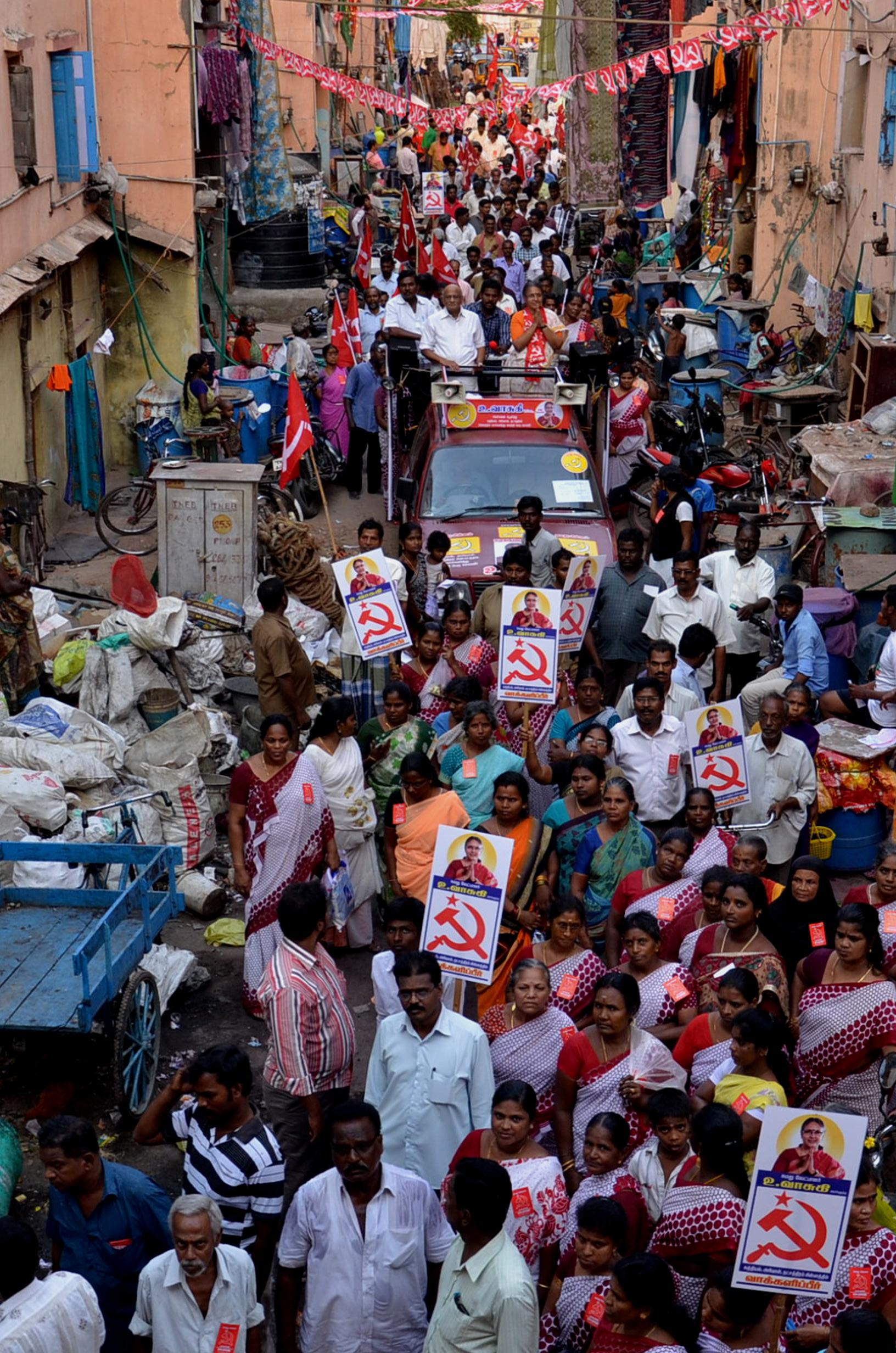
Campaigning in Chennai North

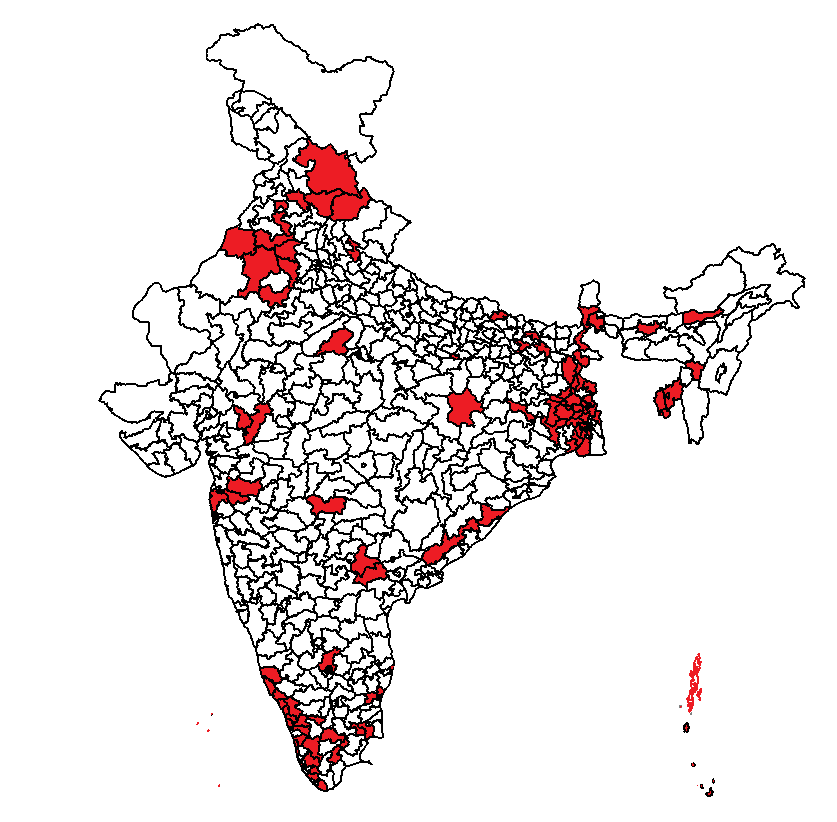
Map of constituencies where the CPI(M) had candidates in the 2014 Indian general election as of April 12, 2014

In the 9 March 2013 issue of People's Democracy, the central organ of the Communist Party of India (Marxist), lists of candidates of the Left Fronts of West Bengal and Tripura for the 2014 Indian general election were announced. In Tripura both Left Front nominees were CPI(M) leaders. In West Bengal, 32 out of the 42 Left Front candidates came from CPI(M). The newspaper also issued a 'first list' of 25 candidates of the party in other states. The list was finalised at a meeting of the Central Committee of the party in Delhi. The meeting also tasked the Politburo of the party to finalise the election manifesto of the party, to be released at a later date.

The 15 candidates of the party in Kerala, where it forms part of the Left Democratic Front, were decided at a CPI(M) state committee meeting held on 12 March 2014.

On 19 March 2014 the party released its third list of candidates, with names of candidates in Tamil Nadu, Chhattisgarh, Andaman and Nicobar Islands and Rajasthan. On 3 April 2014 the party published its fourth list of candidates, with names of candidates in Bihar, Punjab and Maharashtra. On 12 April 2014 three candidates in Andhra Pradesh were named. By this point the party had declared 97 candidates nationwide.

== States ==
=== Andhra Pradesh ===
No candidates from Andhra Pradesh were listed in the 'first list' of candidates released by the CPI(M) Central Committee. In the state CPI(M) and the Communist Party of India could not reach an agreement on seat-sharing. Whilst CPI supported the creation of a separate Telangana state, CPI(M) had opposed the demand. On 10 March 2014 the CPI(M) Telangana State Committee secretary Tammineni Veerabhadram stated at a press meet in Khammam that the party would contest the Khammam, Mahabubabad, Nalgonda and Bhongir Lok Sabha seats. However, he reiterated that the names of candidates in Telangana would be defined only after alliances with other non-BJP/non-Congress parties had been settled.

On 26 March 2014 CPI(M) made public three names of candidates contesting Lok Sabha seats in Telangana. A 6 April 2014 article in People's Democracy mentioned the three Telangana seats, as well as naming Midiam Baburao as the candidate in Araku. By this point no alliances with other parties had been reached. A 12 April 2014 article released by the Press Trust of India named two candidates in Telangana as well as Midiam Baburao in Araku. However, the party hinted that it would further increase its list of candidates in the state. The party withdrew its candidate in the Khammam seat, Sameena Afroz, after an understanding had been reached with the YSR Congress Party.

Constituency No.	Constituency	Reserved for (SC/ST/None)	Candidate
13	Nalgonda	None	N. Narsimha Reddy
14	Bhuvanagiri	None	C. Seetaramulu
18	Araku	ST	Midiam Baburao

=== Assam ===
CPI(M) announced three candidates in Assam, including the party state committee secretary and former MP Uddhab Barman. An alliance was formed with the Communist Party of India in the state, with CPI contesting the Jorhat seat.

Constituency No.	Constituency	Reserved for (SC/ST/None)	Candidate
2	Silchar	None	Rejamond Ali
6	Barpeta	None	Uddhab Barman
9	Tezpur	None	Khemraj Chetri

=== Bihar ===
No names from Bihar were mentioned in the 'first list' of candidates released by the CPI(M) Central Committee. As of January 2014 CPI(M) sought to establish an alliance with the Janata Dal (United). Politburo member S. Ramachandran Pillai stated to The Hindu that the break between BJP and JD(U) was a major development, and that the JD(U) was the sole alternative as a partner to counter the influence of BJP in the election. According to a March 2014 report of NDTV was contesting the elections in Bihar alone and was planning to put up four candidates. The fourth list of candidates, released on 3 April 2014, carried four names from Bihar.

Constituency No.	Constituency	Reserved for (SC/ST/None)	Candidate
2	Paschim Champaran	None	Prabhuraj Narayan Rao
14	Darbhanga	None	Hriday Narayan Yadav
22	Ujiarpur	None	Ramdeo Verma
25	Khagaria	None	Jagadish Chandra Basu

=== Chhattisgarh ===
Constituency No.	Constituency	Reserved for (SC/ST/None)	Candidate
1	Sarguja	ST	Surinder Lal Singh

=== Gujarat ===
The party announced that Singhjibhai Katara would stand as its candidate in Dahod, a constituency in the tribal belt of the state. Katara had stood as a candidate in the 2009 election, obtaining 29,522 votes (5.52%).

Constituency No.	Constituency	Reserved for (SC/ST/None)	Candidate
19	Dahod	ST	Singhjibhai Katara

=== Haryana ===
In March 2014 the Haryana units of CPI(M) and CPI announced that they would contest 5 Lok Sabha seats jointly. CPI(M) launched three candidates whilst CPI fielded two. The CPI(M) candidates announced were Phool Singh Sheokand (former president of the Hisar Agriculture University Students Union, trade union leader), Ram Kumar Bahbalpuria (agricultural workers union leader, who had mobilised farmers against the Gorakhpur Nuclear Power Plant) and Master Sher Singh (leader of Haryana teachers union and Kisan Sabha).

Constituency No.	Constituency	Reserved for (SC/ST/None)	Candidate
3	Sirsa	SC	Ram Kumar Bahbalpuria
4	Hissar	None	Phool Singh Sheokand
8	Bhiwani-Mahendragarh	None	Master Sher Singh

=== Himachal Pradesh ===
In November 2013 CPI(M) named two candidates to contest the elections; Jagat Ram, secretary of the Lal Jhanda Union and secretary of the Shimla unit of the Centre of Indian Trade Unions, and Kushal Bhardwaj, vice president of the Himachal Kisan Sabha and former leader of the Students Federation of India. Ahead of the election, the Himachal Pradesh state unit of CPI(M) declared that the party would contest poll jointly with CPI in the state. The slogan of the state-level election charter was defined as "Reject Congress, Defeat BJP".

Constituency No.	Constituency	Reserved for (SC/ST/None)	Candidate
2	Mandi	None	Kushal Bhardwaj
4	Shimla	SC	Jagat Ram

=== Jammu & Kashmir ===
No names from Jammu & Kashmir were included in the 'first list' of candidates released by the CPI(M) Central Committee. In October 2013 CPI(M), CPI, Lok Janshakti Party, Samajwadi Party, People's Democratic Front, J&K National Democratic Front and International Democratic Party founded a new alliance, the J&K People's United Front with CPI(M) J&K State Committee secretary Mohammed Yousuf Tarigami as convenor. On 2 April 2014 the People's United Front decided not to contest the Lok Sabha polls.

=== Jharkhand ===
During a visit to Ranchi on 10 March 2014, Politburo member Brinda Karat declared that CPI(M) would contest as part of a Left Front consisting of CPI(M), CPI, the Communist Party of India (Marxist-Leninist) Liberation and the Marxist Coordination Committee. Within the framework of this seat sharing CPI(M) would put up candidates in Rajmahal and Ranchi, whilst CPI would contest Dumka, Hazaribagh and Chatra, CPI(ML) would contest Koderma and MCC would field a candidate in Dhanbad. Karat also stated that further seats could be contested as well by the front. However, the following day the CPI(ML) Liberation general secretary stated that whilst they would support CPI(M) in Rajmahal and MCC in Dhanbad, their party would field a candidate as well in Ranchi.

Both CPI(M) candidates in the state are former Members of Legislative Assembly.

Constituency No.	Constituency	Reserved for (SC/ST/None)	Candidate
1	Rajmahal	ST	Jyotin Soren
8	Ranchi	None	Rajinder Singh Munda

=== Karnataka ===
In reaction to the failure of other non-Congress/non-BJP parties in the state, particularly the Janata Dal (Secular), to reach a seat-sharing agreement three left parties (CPI(M), CPI and the All India Forward Bloc) to launch five candidates of their own. As per the CPI(M), it announced two candidates in the state. G.V. Srirama Reddy is the secretary of the Karnataka State Committee of the party and a former Member of Legislative Assembly for the Bagepalli constituency. K. Yadav Shetty is a CPI(M) District Secretariat member and an agrarian leader. He is the general secretary of the district-level unit of the Karnataka Pranta Rajya Sangha and a secretary of its statewide leadership, leading resistance against the proposed HPCL pipeline project in the area.

Constituency No.	Constituency	Reserved for (SC/ST/None)	Candidate
17	Dakshina Kannada	None	K. Yadav Shetty
27	Chikballapur	None	G.V. Srirama Reddy

=== Kerala ===
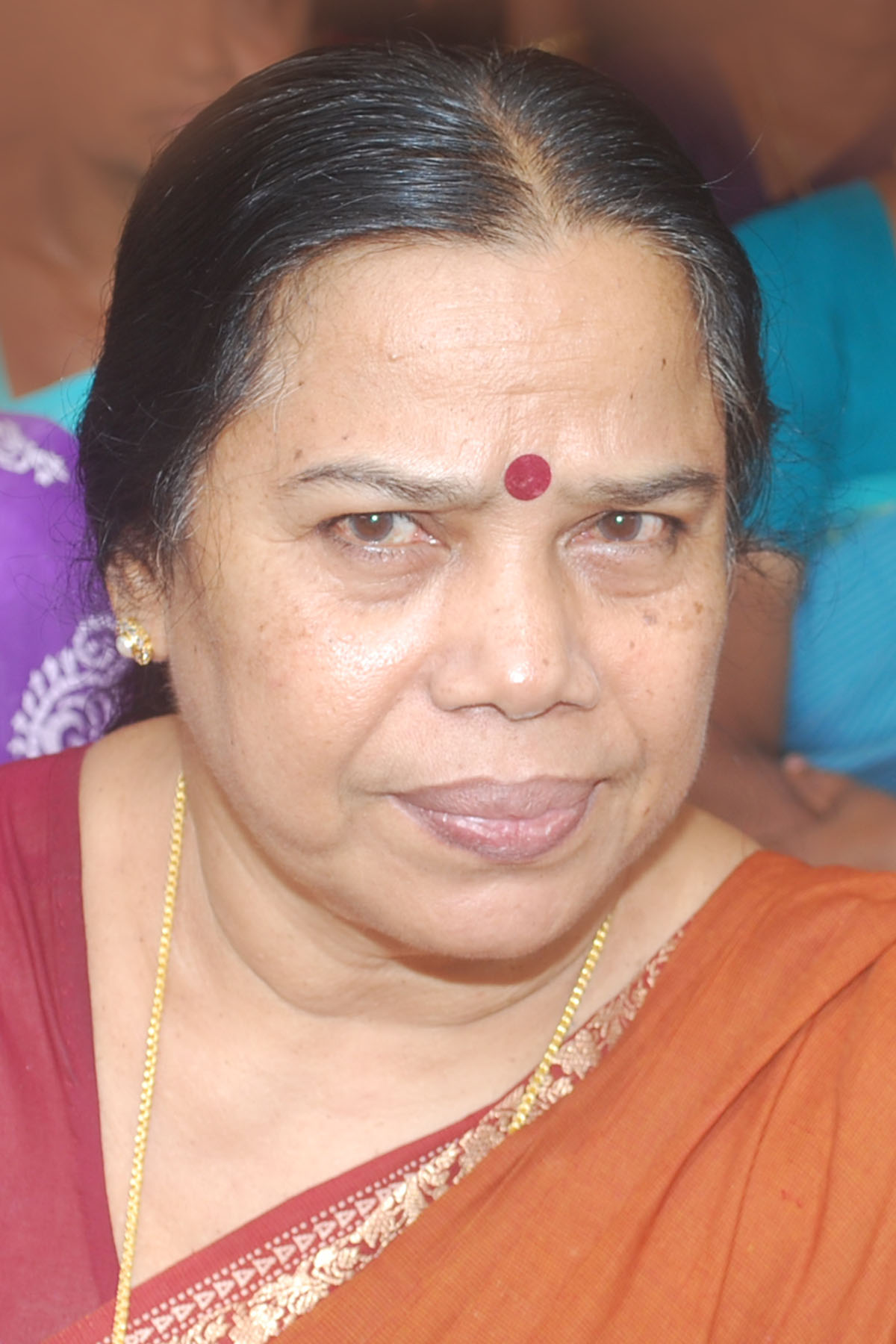
P.K. Sreemathy, CPI(M) candidate in Kannur

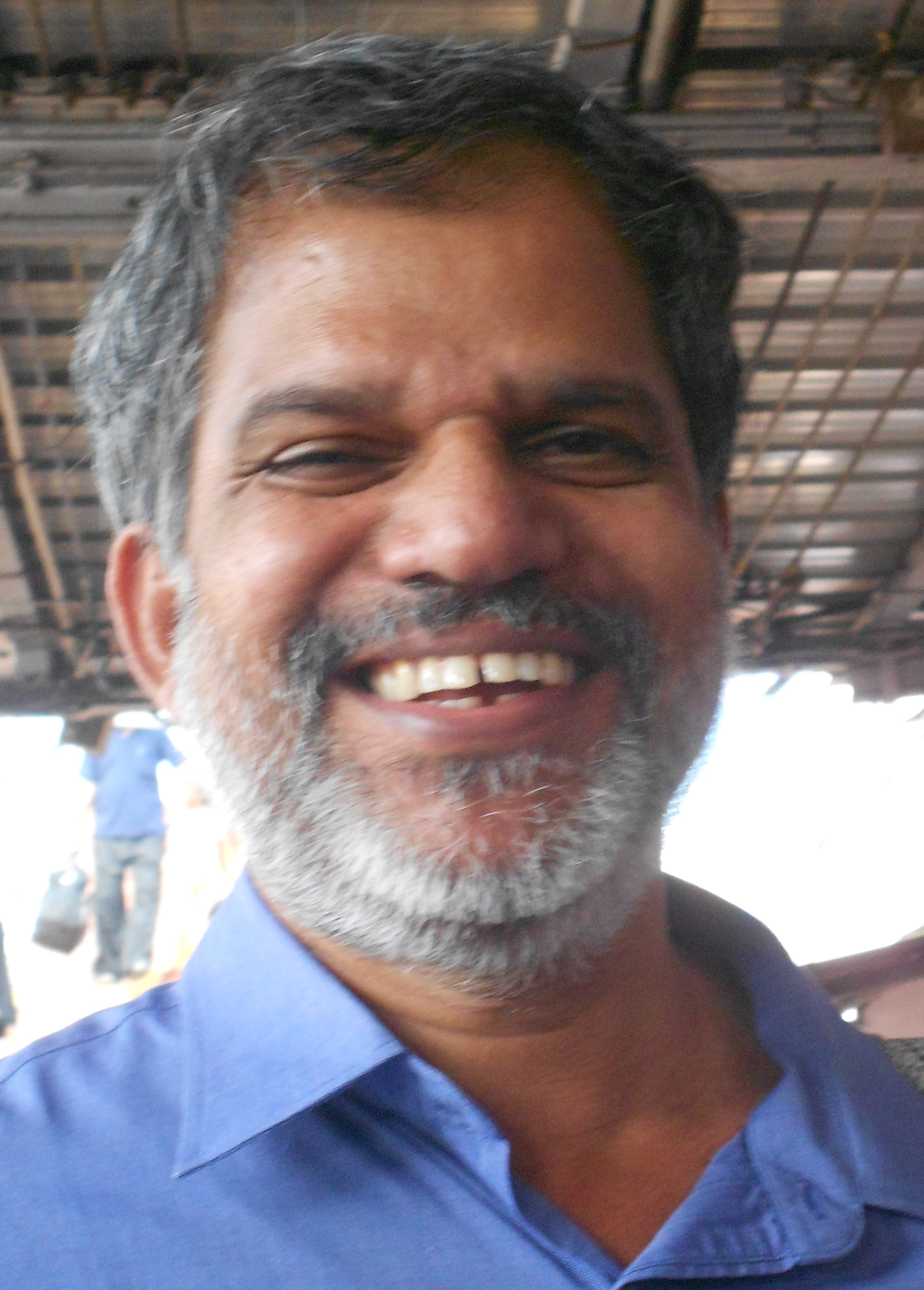
A. Vijayaraghavan, CPI(M) candidate in Kozhikode

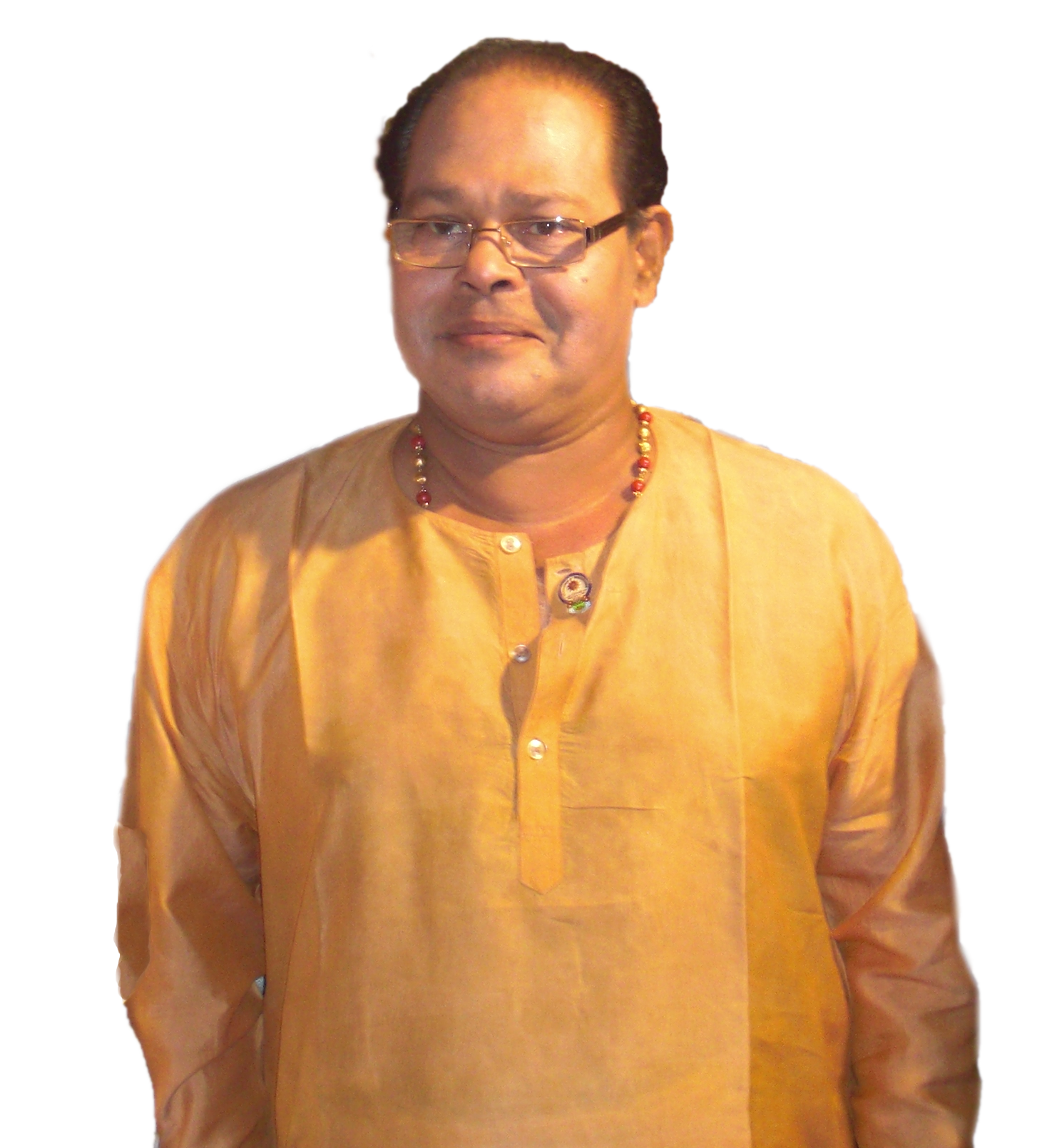
Innocent, CPI(M)-supported independent candidate in Chalakudy

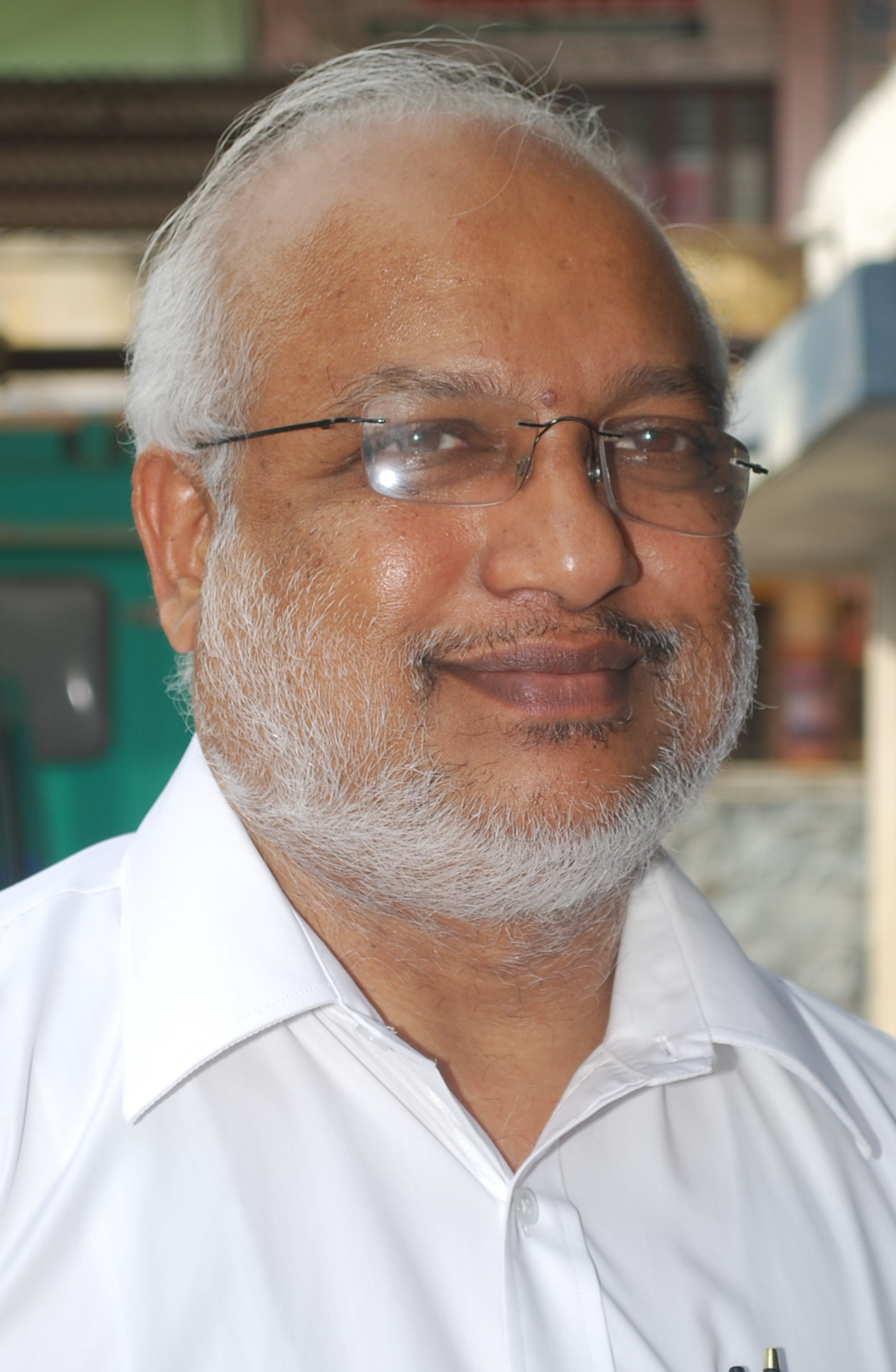
M.A. Baby, CPI(M) candidate in Kollam

In Kerala CPI(M) contests elections as a constituent of the Left Democratic Front. In the list of the 15 CPI(M) candidates in Kerala released in mid-March were four incumbent Lok Sabha members and five independents. The CPI(M)-backed independents included the actor Innocent, former All India Congress Committee member Peelipose Thomas, the church-backed High Range Protection Committee leader Joice George and former Gujarat cadre IAS officer Christy Fernandez and V. Abdurahman.

The Kollam seat was allocated to former state minister and senior CPI(M) leader M.A. Baby, after the Revolutionary Socialist Party deserted the LDF and joined the United Democratic Front.

Constituency No.	Constituency	Reserved for (SC/ST/None)	Candidate
1	Kasaragod	None	P. Karunakaran
2	Kannur	None	P.K. Sreemathy
3	Vatakara	None	A.N. Shamseer
5	Kozhikode	None	A. Vijayaraghavan
6	Malappuram	None	P.K. Saniaba
7	Ponnani	None	V. Abdurahman
8	Palakkad	None	M.B. Rajesh
9	Alathur	SC	P.K. Biju
11	Chalakudy	None	Innocent
12	Ernakulam	None	Christy Fernandez
13	Idukki	None	Joice George
15	Alappuzha	None	C.B. Chandrababu
17	Pathanamthitta	None	Peelipose Thomas
18	Kollam	None	M.A. Baby
19	Attingal	None	A. Sampath

=== Madhya Pradesh ===
The party announced two candidates from Madhya Pradesh. Early CPI(M), CPI and Samajwadi Party had an alliance in the state, but this alliance was broken during the 2013 Legislative Assembly elections. Ahead of the 2014 CPI(M), CPI and Rashtriya Samanta Dal formed an alliance. CPI(M) candidate Akhilesh Yadav is the secretary of the Gwalior District unit of the party.

Constituency No.	Constituency	Reserved for (SC/ST/None)	Candidate
3	Gwalior	None	Akhilesh Yadav
24	Ratlam	ST	Lata Bharbore

=== Maharashtra ===
The party announced four candidates from Maharashtra. Ladak Kharpade is a member of the CPI(M) Thane District Secretariat. Tanaji Jaybhave is a member of the Nasik Municipal Corporation. D.B. Naik is a Kisan Sabha leader.

Constituency No.	Constituency	Reserved for (SC/ST/None)	Candidate
15	Hingoli	None	D.B. Naik
20	Dindori	ST	Hemant Waghere
21	Nashik	None	Tanaji Jaybhave
22	Palghar	ST	Ladak Kharpade

=== Manipur ===
The party did not launch any candidate of its own in Manipur. In the Inner Manipur seat the party supported Moirangthem Nara Singh of CPI, as the common candidate of the Left and Secular Alliance. In the Outer Manipur seat it decided to support the NCP nominee Chungkhokai Doungel.

=== Odisha ===
In Odisha the Lok Sabha elections of 2014 coincides with the Legislative Assembly election. Talks on seat sharing between CPI(M) and CPI concerned both elections. As of mid-March 2014 no seat-sharing agreement had been reached between the left parties and the Biju Janata Dal in the state. CPI(M) had, however, expressed that they would support CPI candidates. There had been some disagreements on the Balasore Lok Sabha seat, which both parties wanted to contest. In the end CPI(M) decided not to field a candidate there, instead they got support from CPI for their candidature in the Remuna assembly seat (which is within the boundaries of the Balasore Lok Sabha constituency). In the Berhampur Lok Sabha constituency Odisha, the CPI(M) fielded veteran communist leader and state secretariat member Ali Kishor Patnaik. CPI(M) also reached an agreement with CPI(ML) Liberation that they would exchange mutual support in the seats where they did contest against each other.

Constituency No.	Constituency	Reserved for (SC/ST/None)	Candidate
20	Berhampur	None	Ali Kishor Patnaik

=== Punjab ===
On 17 January 2014 CPI(M) Punjab State Committee Secretary Charan Singh Virdi stated that the party would contest four Lok Sabha seats on its own, fielding Balbir Singh Jadla in Anandpur Sahib, Sukhwinder Singh Sekhon in Ludhiana, Joginder Singh Aulakh from Sangrur and a fourth candidate from Jalandhar. On 28 February 2014, in response to the failure of Sanjha Morcha to reach a seat-sharing agreement, Virdi stated that the party would contest the four Lok Sabha seats on its own. The Sanjha Morcha had been formed ahead of the 2012 Legislative Assembly election, as a non-Congress/non-BJP alliance consisting of the People's Party of Punjab, Shiromani Akali Dal (Longowal), CPI(M) and CPI. Seat-sharing talks broke down on 28 February 2014 as information emerged that the PPP had held negotiations with the Indian National Congress.

Balbir Singh Jadla and Sukhwinder Singh Sekhon were included in the 'first list' released by the CPI(M) Central Committee. Sukhwinder Singh Sekhon is the general secretary of the Punjab Kisan Sabha. Balbir Singh Jadla is a member of the Punjab State Committee of the party. On 3 April 2014 the party announced a third candidate in Punjab, the teacher Joginder Singh Aulakh contesting the Sangrur seat.

Constituency No.	Constituency	Reserved for (SC/ST/None)	Candidate
6	Anandpur Sahib	None	Balbir Singh Jadla
7	Ludhiana	None	Sukhwinder Singh Sekhon
12	Sangrur	None	Joginder Singh Aulakh

=== Rajasthan ===
The candidates of the party in Rajasthan includes veteran leader, Central Committee member and former Member of Legislative Assembly Amraram. The party fought the elections as a constituent of the Rajasthan Loktantrik Morcha, a front consisting of CPI(M), CPI, Samajwadi Party, Janata Dal (United) and Janata Dal (Secular).

Constituency No.	Constituency	Reserved for (SC/ST/None)	Candidate
1	Ganganagar	None	Pala Ram
3	Churu	None	Inder Singh Poonia
5	Sikar	None	Amraram

=== Tamil Nadu ===
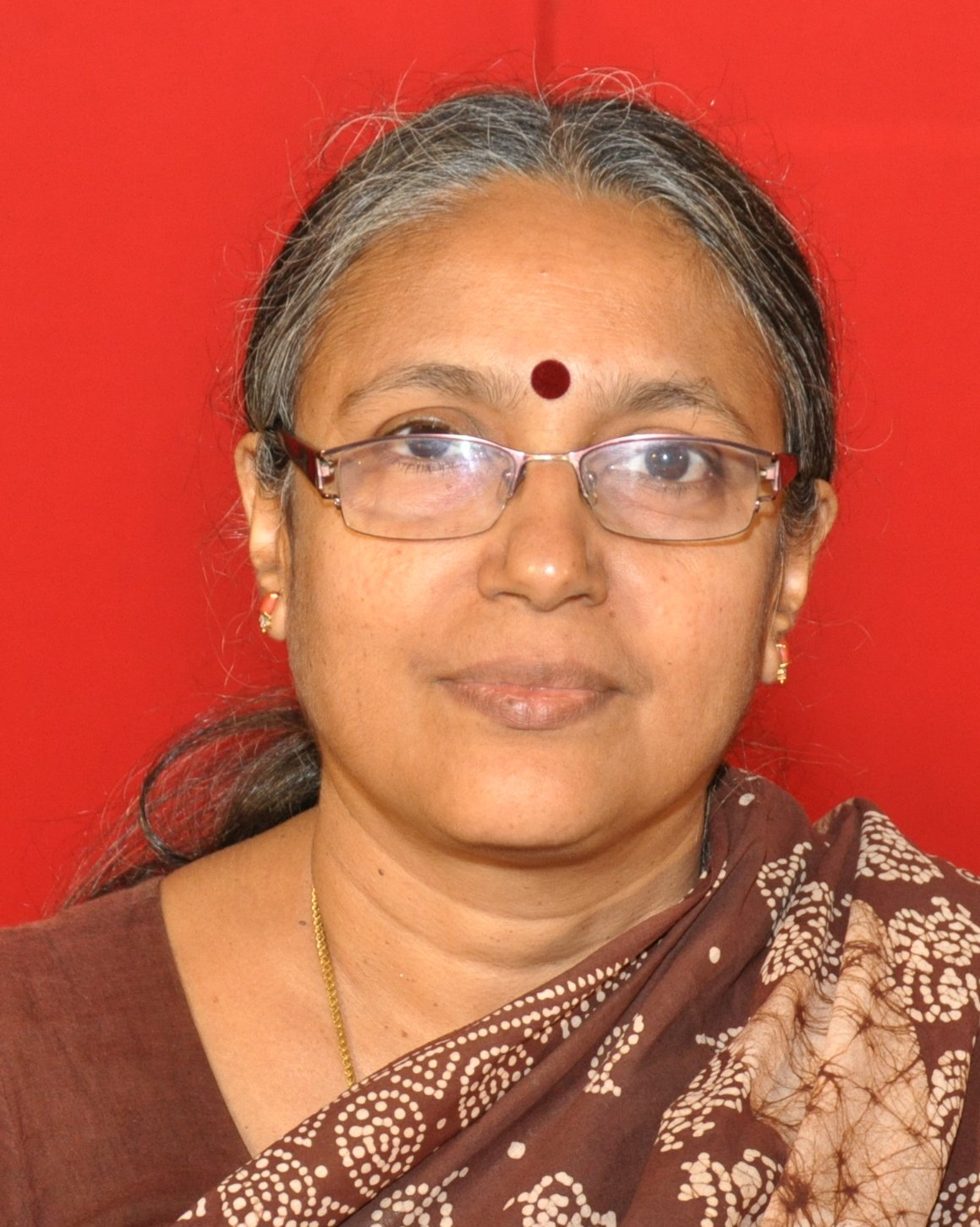
U. Vasuki, CPI(M) candidate in Chennai North

After six rounds of seat-sharing talks with AIADMK for the Lok Sabha seats in Tamil Nadu and Puducherry failed to bear fruit, CPI(M) and CPI opted to make an alliance of their own. On 14 March 2014 the two parties held a joint press conference in Chennai, declaring that each of the parties would contest nine Lok Sabha seats each. This was the first time a formalised poll pact had been reached between the two parties in Tamil Nadu. At the press conference it was stated that CPI(M) would put up candidates in the Coimbatore, Madurai, Kanyakumari, Chennai (North), Dindigul, Tiruchi, Virudhunagar, Villupuram (SC) and Thanjavur seats.

On 17 March 2014 the party released the names of its nine candidates in the state. The list includes incumbent MP P.R. Natarajan, former MP A.V. Bellarmin and K. Samuel Raj, general secretary of the Tamil Nadu Untouchability Eradication Front. U. Vasuki was fielded for the Chennai North seat, where the party concentrated its campaign on issues like sea incursion affecting the lives of local fishermen.

Constituency No.	Constituency	Reserved for (SC/ST/None)	Candidate
2	Chennai North	None	U. Vasuki
13	Villupuram	SC	G. Anandhan
20	Coimbatore	None	P.R. Natarajan
22	Dindigul	None	N. Pandi
24	Tiruchirappalli	None	S. Sridhar
30	Thanjavur	None	S. Tamilselvi
32	Madurai	None	P. Vikraman
34	Virudhunagar	None	K. Samuel Raj
39	Kanyakumari	None	A.V. Bellarmin

=== Tripura ===
In Tripura, where CPI(M) had won both Lok Sabha seats in the 2009 election, the party decided to field two new candidates. Sankar Prasad Dutta is the state general secretary of CITU and a member of the CPI(M) Tripura State Committee since 2012. He is a former youth leader and Member of the Legislative Assembly of Tripura. Dutta filed his nomination on 18 March 2014. Jitendra Choudhury is the state government Minister for Forest, Rural Development and Industries and Commerce. He is a member of the CPI(M) Tripura State Committee since 1988 and a member of the Central Kisan Committee (the national leadership of the All India Kisan Sabha).

Constituency No.	Constituency	Reserved for (SC/ST/None)	Candidate
1	Tripura West	None	Sankar Prasad Dutta
2	Tripura East	ST	Jitendra Choudhury

=== Uttar Pradesh ===
The party fielded Hiralal Yadav in the hotly contested Varanasi seat. Yadav filed his nomination papers on 21 April 2014. His followers raised the slogan 'Na Modi, na Kejriwal, abki baar Hiralal' ('Not Modi, Not Kejriwal, this time is Hiralal'). Announcing his support for Yadav's campaign the All India People's Front convenor Akhilendra Pratap Singh argued that both Modi and Kejriwal would implement World Bank dictates.

Constituency No.	Constituency	Reserved for (SC/ST/None)	Candidate
6	Moradabad	None	Nafeesuddin
77	Varanasi	None	Hiralal Yadav

=== Uttarakhand ===
Constituency No.	Constituency	Reserved for (SC/ST/None)	Candidate
1	Tehri Garhwal	None	Shiv Prasad Deoli

=== West Bengal ===
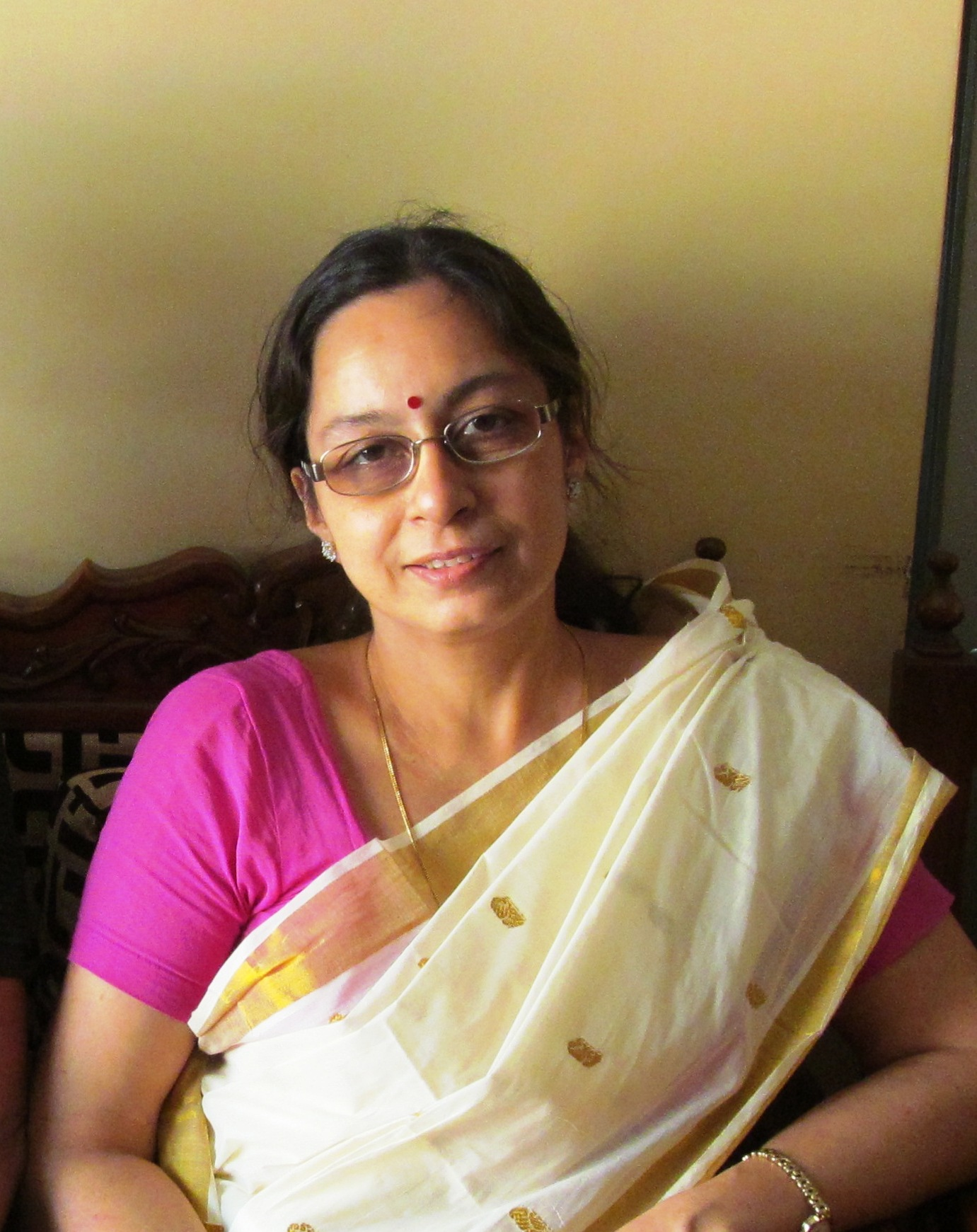
Nandini Mukherjee, CPI(M) candidate in Kolkata Dakshin

32 out of the 42 Left Front candidates in West Bengal came from the CPI(M). 20 of the CPI(M) candidates were newcomers in their parliamentary constituencies. Five of the CPI(M) candidates were women. 25-year old Sheikh Ibrahim Ali, candidate in Tamluk, is the youngest Lok Sabha candidate in the history of the party.

Constituency No.	Constituency	Reserved for (SC/ST/gen)	Candidate	Result	percentage of votes
3	Jalpaiguri	SC	Mahendra Kumar Roy	second	32.65
4	Darjeeling	None	Saman Pathak	third	14.6
5	Raiganj	None	Md. Salim	won	29
7	Maldaha Uttar	None	Khagen Murmu	second	27.75
8	Maldaha Dakshin	None	Abul Hasnat Khan	second	32.65
9	Jangipur	None	Muzaffar Hossain	second	33.07
11	Murshidabad	None	Badarudzza Khan	won	33.33
12	Krishnanagar	None	Santanu Jha	second	29.43
13	Ranaghat	SC	Archna Biswas	second	28.72
14	Bangaon	SC	Debesh Das	second	31.52
15	Barrackpur	None	Subhashini Ali	second	25.92
16	Dum Dum	None	Asim Dasgupta	second	28.99
20	Mathurapur	SC	Rinku Naskar	second	38.67
21	Diamond Harbour	None	Abul Hasnat	second	34.64
22	Jadavpur	None	Sujan Chakraborty	second	36.08
23	Kolkata Dakshin	None	Nandini Mukherjee	third	23.83
24	Kolkata Uttar	None	Rupa Bagchi	third	20.50
25	Howrah	None	Sreedip Bhattacharya	second	25.90
26	Uluberia	None	Sabiruddin Mollah	second	31.15
27	Sreerampur	None	Tirthankar Roy	second	28.08
28	Hooghly	None	Pradip Saha	second	31.52
29	Arambag	SC	Shakti Mohan Malik	second	29.51
30	Tamluk	None	Sk. Ibrahim Ali	second	35.02
31	Kanthi	None	Tapas Sinha	second	34.72
33	Jhargram	ST	Pulin Bihari Baske	second	26.5
36	Bankura	None	Basudeb Acharia	second	31.05
37	Bishnupur	SC	Susmita Bauri	second	33.73
38	Bardhaman Purba	SC	Iswar Chandra Das	second	34.83
39	Bardhaman-Durgapur	None	Sk. Saidul Haque	second	33.59
40	Asansol	None	Bansa Gopal Chowdhury	third	22.39
41	Bolpur	SC	Ram Chandra Dome	second	30.24
42	Birbhum	None	Kamre Elahi	second	30.82

== Union territories ==
=== Andaman and Nicobar Islands ===
The party fielded K.G. Das as its candidate for the sole seat in the Andaman and Nicobar Islands. Das is the secretary of the State Organising Committee of the party in the islands and the convener of the Left Democratic Front, Andaman and Nicobar Islands. LDF unites the local branches of CPI(M), All India Forward Bloc, Rashtriya Janata Dal, Telugu Desam Party, CPI(ML) Liberation and Lok Janshakti Party.

Constituency No.	Constituency	Reserved for (SC/ST/None)	Candidate
1	Andaman and Nicobar Islands	None	K.G. Das

=== Lakshadweep ===
Ahead of the election CPI(M) fielded Dr. Muneer, a social activist from Minicoy, as its candidate for the sole seat of the Union Territory of Lakshadweep.

Constituency No.	Constituency	Reserved for (SC/ST/None)	Candidate
1	Lakshadweep	ST	Muneer

=== Puducherry ===
Following the break-down of seat-sharing talks with AIADMK, a seat-sharing agreement of CPI(M) and CPI was declared on 15 March (see the Tamil Nadu section). As part of this agreement CPI(M) would support a CPI candidate in the Puducherry seat.

== See also ==
- List of constituencies of the Lok Sabha
- Third Front (India)
- List of Left Front candidates in the Indian general election, 2014
- List of United Progressive Alliance candidates in the Indian general election, 2014
- List of National Democratic Alliance candidates in the Indian general election, 2014
