= Secular Progressive Front (2002–2012) =

Defunct political Alliance in Manipur, India

- SPF; Secular Progressive Front
- Abbreviation: SPF
- Chairperson: Okram Ibobi Singh
- Founder: Okram Ibobi Singh
- Founded: 1 March 2002
- Dissolved: 2012
- Headquarters: Manipur
- Political position: Center left

The Secular Progressive Front was a political alliance in Manipur, India, which formed before the 2002 Manipur Legislative Assembly election and ruled Manipur from 2002 until 2012, when the alliance was broken.

== Front members ==
The political parties of the alliance were:

Party	Symbol
Indian National Congress	
Communist Party of India	
Nationalist Congress Party	
Manipur State Congress Party	

== Background and electoral performance ==
=== Formation and 2002 assembly election ===
In 2002 Manipur Legislative Assembly election, it was resulted hung assembly with INC winning 20 seats, FPP winning 13 seats, MSCP winning 7 seats, CPI 5 seats, BJP 4 seats, NCP 3 seats and others 8 seats. SPF was formed on 1 March 2002 and it urged the Governor Ved Marwah to invite them to form the Government with a list of 33 supporting MLAs. On 7 March 2002, first SPF Government was created. Along with chief minister Okram Ibobi Singh from INC, ministers were sworn in including Govindas Konthoujam of MSCP, Pheiroijam Parijat Singh of CPI and Chungkhokai Doungel of NCP. DRPP with 2 MLAs joined SPF afterwards. MLAs from NCP, MSCP DRPP and Samata Party defected to INC making their strength 33 in the assembly.

=== 2007 assembly election ===
In the 2007 Manipur Legislative Assembly election, Congress and CPI were not allied. But they formed the Government together as SPF along with NCP. In the election, INC won 30 seats, CPI 4, NCP 5 and MSCP 0 seats. On 1 March 2007, Congress and CPI jointly held the SPF Steering Committee Meeting, where 3 MLAs of RJD, 3 MLAs of NPP and 3 Independent MLAs supported SPF Government on 2 March 2007.

=== Dissolution ===
In the 2012 Manipur Legislative Assembly election, INC contested on its own, dissolving the front. CPI contested on 24 seats. In the election INC won absolute majority of its own with 42 MLAs and CPI having no representatives in the assembly.

== See also ==
- Secular Progressive Front
- Manipur Progressive Secular Alliance
- Left and Democratic Front
- Left and Secular Alliance
