= Yumnam Joykumar Singh =

Indian politician and ex.Deputy Chief Minister of Manipur

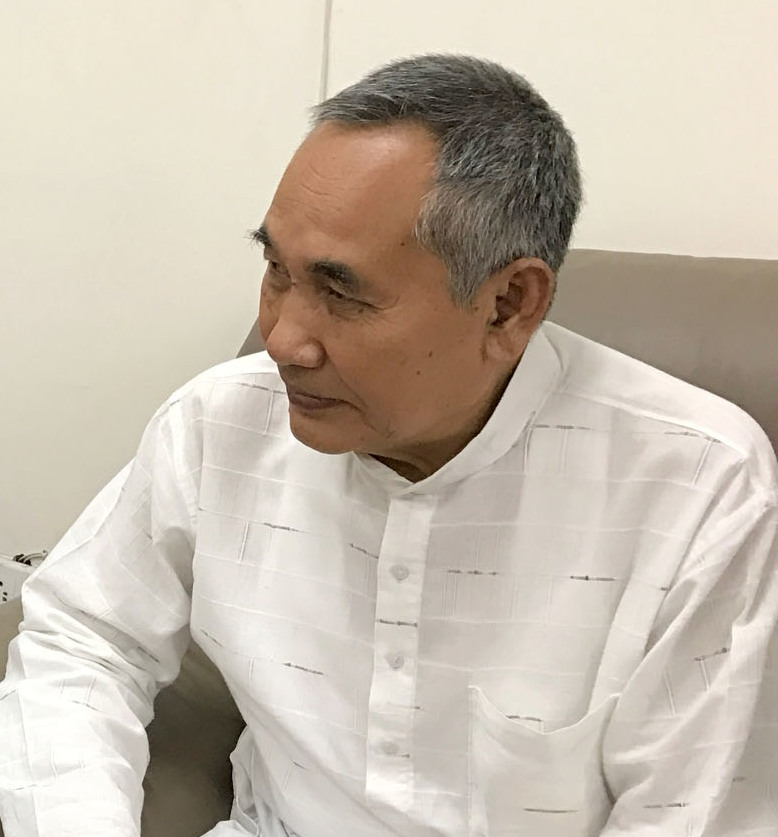

Deputy Chief Minister of Manipur
- In office 15 March 2017 & 5 July 2020 – 17 June 2020 & 10 March 2022
- Chief Minister: N. Biren Singh
- Ministry and Departments: Minister of Finance, Excise, Taxation, Science and Technology, Economics and Statistics and Civil Aviation; Government of Manipur
- Preceded by: Gaikhangam Gangmei & himself
- Succeeded by: Losii Dikho; Nemcha Kipgen

Member of the Manipur Legislative Assembly

Assembly Member for Uripok
- In office 2017–2022
- Preceded by: Laishram Nandakumar Singh
- Succeeded by: Khwairakpam Raghumani Singh

Personal details
- Born: 1 January 1955 (age 71)
- Party: National People's Party
- Education: Post Graduate
- Occupation: Politician, DGP

Yumnam Joykumar Singh is an Indian politician and member of the National People's Party. He served as a deputy chief minister of Manipur from 2017 to 2022 in the N. Biren Singh led cabinet.

Before entering politics he was an IPS officer who served as Director General of Police (DGP) of Manipur from 2007 to 2012.
