= Left and Secular Democratic Front (Manipur) =

- Founded: 2017
- Dissolved: 2022
- Ideology: Big tent Factions: Communism; Marxism-Leninism; Socialism; Liberalism; Secularism; Integral humanism Gandhism; Left-wing nationalism Anti-imperialism
- Political position: Far-left to centre

Left and Secular Democratic Front was a pre-poll alliance of political parties in the Indian state of Manipur, which was formed ahead of the 2017 Manipur Legislative Assembly election.

== History ==
The political parties in the Front had a 35-point common minimum programme. Their manifesto was constituted on the Left Front models of Tripura and Kerala. Moirangthem Nara, who was the general secretary of CPI Manipur, was the Convenor of the alliance.

LDF projected itself as an alternative to both the Congress and the BJP. CPI and MNDF are the dominant parties in the alliance as both have MLAs and ministers in previous Governments. Arvind Kejriwal was invited as their star campaigner in the election.

== Constituent parties ==
The constituent parties in the alliance are:

- Communist Party of India (CPI)
- Communist Party of India (Marxist) (CPIM)
- Nationalist Congress Party (NCP)
- Janata Dal (United) (JD(U))
- Aam Admi Party (AAP)
- People's Democratic Alliance (PDA)
- Manipur National Democratic Front (MNDF)

LDF contested for 52 seats including 2 independents in the 60-member Manipur Legislative Assembly elections of 2017. LDF also had supported Irom Sharmila, who contested from PRJA, on the chief minister's seat. The alliance was dismissed after the election.

== See also ==
- Left and Secular Alliance
- Manipur Progressive Secular Alliance
