= Kangujam Ranjit Singh =

Indian politician

Deputy Leader, Congress Legislative Party, Manipur
- Incumbent
- Assumed office 5 February 2026
- Leader: Keisham Meghachandra Singh

Member of the Manipur Legislative Assembly
- Incumbent
- Assumed office 2000
- Preceded by: Mayanglambam Babu Singh
- Constituency: Sugnu

Personal details
- Born: 1 March 1962 (age 64) Manipur, India
- Party: Indian National Congress
- Profession: Politician

Kangujam Ranjit Singh (born 1 March 1962) is an Indian politician from Manipur. He is serving as a Member of Manipur Legislative Assembly from Sugnu, representing the Indian National Congress.
