= Manipur Pradesh Congress Committee =

Manipur affiliate of the Indian National Congress

- President: Okram Ibobi Singh
- Chairman: Keisham Meghachandra Singh
- Headquarters: B.T. Road, Imphal-795001, Manipur
- Youth wing: Manipur Youth Congress
- Women's wing: Manipur Pradesh Mahila Congress Committee
- Ideology: Populism; Social liberalism; Democratic socialism; Social democracy; Secularism
- ECI Status: A State Unit of Indian National Congress
- Alliance: Manipur Progressive Secular Alliance
- Seats in Rajya Sabha: 0 / 1
- Seats in Lok Sabha: 2 / 2
- Seats in Manipur Legislative Assembly: 5 / 60

Election symbol

Website
- https://www.pccmanipur.in/

The Manipur Pradesh Congress Committee (or MPCC) is the unit of the Indian National Congress for the state of Manipur, India. It is responsible for organizing and coordinating the party's activities and campaigns within the state, as well as selecting candidates for local, state, and national elections in Manipur. Its head office is situated at the Congress Bhawan, B.T. Road, Imphal.

== List of presidents ==
S.no	Portrait	Name	Term		Ref.
1.		T. N. Haokip	29 March 2016	5 February 2019	
2.		Gaikhangam Gangmei	5 February 2019	25 October 2019	
3.		Moirangthem Okendra	25 October 2019	15 December 2020	
4.		Govindas Konthoujam	15 December 2020	25 July 2021	
5.		N Loken Singh	25 July 2021	30 March 2022	
6.		Keisham Meghachandra Singh	30 March 2022	5 February 2026	
7.		Okram Ibobi Singh	05 February 2026	TBA	

== Manipur Legislative Assembly election ==
Year	Party leader	Seats won	Change in seats	Outcome
1967	Mairembam Koireng Singh	16 / 30	▲new	Government
1972	Mairembam Koireng Singh	17 / 60	▲1	Opposition
1974	Raj Kumar Dorendra Singh	13 / 60	▼4	Opposition
1980	Raj Kumar Dorendra Singh	13 / 60	▲0	Government
1984	Rishang Keishing	30 / 60	▲17	Government
1990	Rishang Keishing	24 / 60	▼6	Opposition
1995	Rishang Keishing	22 / 60	▼2	Government
2000	Rishang Keishing	11 / 60	▼11	Opposition
2002	Okram Ibobi Singh	20 / 60	▲9	Government SPF
2007	Okram Ibobi Singh	30 / 60	▲10	Government SPF
2012	Okram Ibobi Singh	42 / 60	▲12	Government
2017	Okram Ibobi Singh	28 / 60	▼19	Opposition
2022	Okram Ibobi Singh	5 / 60	▼23	Opposition MPSA

== Performance in Lok Sabha ==
Lok Sabha Elections
Year	Lok Sabha	Seats contested	Seats won	(+/-) in seats	% of votes	Vote swing	Popular vote	Outcome
1951	1st	2	1 / 2	1	23.82%	New entry	36,317	Government
1957	2nd	2	1 / 2	Steady	27.97%	▲4.15	48,687	Government
1962	3rd	2	1 / 2	Steady	30.93%	▲2.96	81,860	Government
1967	4th	2	0 / 2	▼1	32.68%	▲1.75	1,03,010	Government
1971	5th	2	2 / 2	▲1	30.02%	▼2.66	77,974	Government
1977	6th	2	2 / 2	Steady	45.31%	▲15.29	2,10,851	Opposition
1980	7th	2	1 / 2	▼1	22.99%	▼22.32	1,64,473	Government
1984	8th	2	2 / 2	▲1	34.95%	▲11.96	2,94,002	Government
1989	9th	2	2 / 2	Steady	45.04%	▲10.09	3,87,829	Opposition
1991	10th	2	1 / 2	▼1	38.38%	▼6.66	3,25,023	Government
1996	11th	2	2 / 2	▲1	40.17%	▲1.79	3,85,206	Opposition
1998	12th	2	0 / 2	▼2	18.60%	▼21.57	1,39,434	Opposition
1999	13th	2	1 / 2	▲1	32.75%	▲14.15	2,14,324	Opposition
2004	14th	1	1 / 2	Steady	14.88%	▼17.87	1,54,055	Government
2009	15th	2	2 / 2	▲1	42.96%	▲28.08	5,75,393	Government
2014	16th	2	2 / 2	Steady	41.69%	▼1.27	5,88,872	Opposition
2019	17th	2	0 / 2	▼2	24.63%	▼17.06	3,98,387	Opposition
2024	18th	2	2 / 2	▲2	47.59%	▲22.96	7,52,491	Opposition

== Structure and Composition ==
S.No.	Name	Designation	Incharge
01	Okram Ibobi Singh	President	Manipur Pradesh Congress
02	T. Manga Vaiphei	Working President	Manipur Pradesh Congress
03	Victor Keishing	Working President	Manipur Pradesh Congress
