= Paolienlal Haokip =

Indian politician

Member of the Manipur Legislative Assembly
- In office 2022–2027
- Preceded by: T. N. Haokip
- Constituency: Saikot

Personal details
- Born: June 23, 1974 (age 51)
- Party: Bharatiya Janata Party
- Education: M.Phil, JNU, 1999
- Occupation: Lok Sabha Secretariat, social worker, politician

Paolienlal Haokip is an Indian politician from Manipur and member of the Bharatiya Janata Party. Haokip was first elected to the Manipur Legislative Assembly from Saikot constituency in Churachandpur District in the 2022 elections on a BJP ticket.

== Career ==
Paolienlal Haokip describes himself as coming from the "Hills in Manipur". He joined Jawaharlal Nehru University in 1995 to pursue MA in Politics with specialisation in International Studies. He completed an M. Phil. in 1999.

Between 2002 and 2003, he worked as a research officer in the Institute of Peace and Conflict Studies. Afterwards he joined the Lok Sabha Secretariat, where he worked in various positions till about 2020.

Haokip returned to Manipur in 2020 and worked as a spokesperson of Kuki Inpi Manipur. (Note: Kuki Inpi Manipur is the apex body of the Kuki people in Manipur. The term "Kuki" here might include only Thadou Kukis because the other tribes have their own apex bodies.) The Kuki-Zo community was at that time demanding a territorial council for the Kuki-Zo areas under the Sixth Schedule to the Constitution of India.

=== Manipur Legislative Assembly, 2022–2027 ===
In February 2022, Haokip contested the Saikot seat for Manipur Legislative Assembly as a member of the Bharatiya Janata Party (BJP), and won over his nearest rival by over 2,000 votes. The previous MLA, T. N. Haokip, came as a distant third. Saikot is a constituency reserved for Scheduled Tribes. Haokip is said to have mentioned his tribal affiliation as "Any Kuki Tribes".

In May 2022, Haokip became aware that the Manipur Forest Department issued "show-cause notices" (Note: Notifications of impending evictions unless the villages could provide documentation of their rights over their land in the reserved forest.) to village chiefs in the Dampi Reserved Forest in his constituency, and wrote to the Forest Department that no action should be taken until the matter is considered by the state's Hill Areas Committee. He also wrote to the Minister for Forests, Thongam Biswajit Singh, reminding him about the procedures to be followed for declaring reserved forests as per the Indian Forest Act, 1927, and observed that they do not appear to have been followed in the case of the Dampi Reserve Forest.

Haokip wrote to the minister Biswajit Singh again in April 2023, protesting the fresh surveys ordered in the Churachandpur-Khoupum Protected Forest. In this instance, the state government claimed to have nullified the settlement orders issued in the 1970s to villages embedded in the forest, ordering fresh surveys. Haokip asked how the state government could nullify the orders issued under law by the Assistant Settlement Officers, who were acting in the absence of a Forest Settlement Officer due to the government's failure to appoint one. (Note: The state government's claim was that settlement orders could only be issued by Forest Settlement Officers, not by Assistant Settlement Officers (who were of a junior rank). Hence the government claimed that all the original settlement orders were null and void.) If the fresh surveys were needed because the government lacked survey records then he challenged how the original gazette declaring the Protected Forest could be valid in the first place.

Haokip was counted as a dissenter in the ruling Bharatiya Janata Party by this time, objecting to the evictions from reserved forests, and demanding a proper "settlement policy" for both the hills and the valley. He also objected to communities being demonised by the state government. Some Meitei commentators regarded Haokip's defiance of the state government as a key factor behind the 2023–2025 Manipur violence.

After the onset of the Manipur violence on 3 May 2023, the ten Kuki-Zo legislators of the Manipur Assembly, including Paolienlal Haokip, moved out of the Imphal Valley. One of the legislators Vungzagin Valte was brutally assaulted on the second day of the violence, causing all of them to feel unsafe. They issued a statement on 12 May, calling for a separate administration for the Kuki-Zo areas. "As the state of Manipur has miserably failed to protect us, we seek from the Union of India a separate administration under the Constitution of India," read the statement. It said that living among the majority Meitei community was "as good as death for our people".

In August 2023, the ten legislators, including Haokip, again submitted a memorandum to the Prime Minister Narendra Modi requesting the creation of posts of Chief Secretary and Director General of Police for the Kuki-Zo-inhabited hill districts. The signatories also asked for a sanction of Rs. 500 crore from the Prime Minister's Relief Fund for the relief of the Kuki-Zo victims.

Haokip held the state government's anti-encroachment drive and the "dangerous narrative" about illegal immigrants to be the key factors behind the ethnic tensions. He was also critical of the role of the chief minister N. Biren Singh, calling him "anti-Kuki" and "prejudiced". As the violence continued unabated for over two years , Haokip's criticism of chief minister Biren Singh turned strident, with labels of "mad man, marauder and liar". After the Manipur tapes came to light, purportedly containing comments made by Singh, Haokip wrote to the Union home minister Amit Shah, asking him to get the tapes investigated under the Supreme Court's watch. Eventually, Singh resigned in February 2025 and the state of Manipur came under President's Rule, with the legislature put under suspended animation. Haokip called it "good riddance".

In September 2025, BJP state unit spokesperson Michael Lamjathang Haokip, (Note: A former leader of the Thadou Students Association, Lamjathang Haokip was appointed a spokesperson of BJP in 2022. In November 2024, he was instrumental in the formation of an organisation called "Thadou Inpi Manipur", which was however not recognised by the older Thadou Inpi General Headquarters.) in conjunction with a Meitei activist Mayanglam Bobby, questioned Paolienlal Haokip's Scheduled Tribe status, stating that Any Kuki Tribes was not a recognised Scheduled Tribe at the time of his birth. The two activists asked for the disqualification of Paolienlal Haokip from the state legislature. Paolienlal Haokip dismissed the allegations.

== Electoral history ==
- Elected MLA from 59 Saikot(ST) A/C, 12th Manipur Legislative Assembly 2022.
