= Wangkhem Assembly constituency =

Legislative Assembly constituency in Manipur State, India

Coordinates: 24.66°N 94.04°E

Wangkhem
- Constituency for the Manipur Legislative Assembly

Constituency details
- Country: India
- Region: Northeast India
- State: Manipur
- District: Thoubal
- Lok Sabha constituency: Inner Manipur
- Established: 1974
- Total electors: 33,866
- Reservation: None

Member of Legislative Assembly
- 12th Manipur Legislative Assembly
- Incumbent Keisham Meghachandra Singh
- Party: INC
- Alliance: MPSA
- Elected year: 2022

Wangkhem Legislative Assembly constituency is one of the 60 Legislative Assembly constituencies of Manipur state in India.

It is part of Thoubal district. As of 2022, its representative in the Legislative Assembly is Keisham Meghachandra Singh of the Indian National Congress.

== Extent ==
Wangkhem is the 32nd among 60 constituencies of Manipur. It consists of 39 parts namely: 1 - Haokha Mamang Leikai (A), 2 - Haokha Mamang Leikai (B), 3 - Haokha Maning, 4 - Thoubal Khunou, 5 - Kiyam Wangmataba Leikai, 6 - Kiyam Siphai Litanpok Leikai, 7 - Kiyam Siphai Amurijam Leikai, 8 - Kiyam Siphai, 9 - Kiyam Siphai Khong Ahanbi, 10 - Kiyam Siphai Laithagol Leikai, 11 - Hayel Labuk, 12 - Phoudel Mamang Leikai, 13 - Phoudel Maning Leikai, 14 - Phoudel Keirambi, 15 - Singa Mathak Leikai, 16 - Singa Mayai Leikai, 17 - Singa Huidrom Leikai, 18 - Wangkhem (A), 19 - Wangkhem (B), 20 - Yairipok Bishnunaha Awang Leikai, 21 - Bishnunaha Mamang Leikai, 22 - Bishnunaha Makha Leikai, 23 - Charangpat Mamang Mathak, 24 - Charangpat Mamang Makha, 25 - Charangpat Maklang Maning Leikai, 26 - Charangpat Maklang Awang Leikai, 27 - Icham Khunou, 28 - Yairipok Bambon Leikai (A), 29 - Yairipok Bambon Leikai (B), 30 - Khoirom Mathak Leikai, 31 - Khoirom Laimang Leikai, 32 - Khoirom Kha-Thangba Leikai, 33 - Khoirom Heitroipokpi, 34 - Kekru Mathak Leikai, 35 - Kekru Makha Leikai, 36 - Sangomsang and Chaobok Kabui, 37 - Waithou, 38 - Yairipok Bishnunaha Mayai Leikai, and 39 - Charangpat Maklang Mayai Leikai.

== Members of the Legislative Assembly ==
Year	Name	Party
2002	Nimai Chand Luwang	Manipur Peoples Party
2007	Keisham Meghachandra Singh	Indian National Congress
2012	Keisham Meghachandra Singh	Indian National Congress
2017	Keisham Meghachandra Singh	Indian National Congress
2022	Keisham Meghachandra Singh	Indian National Congress

== Election results ==
Vote share of winning candidates
2022	29.36%
2017	39.52%
2012	39.40%
2007	46.81%
2002	29.61%
2000	35.64%
1995	44.30%
1990	60.17%
1984	26.81%
1980	22.89%
1974	23.73%

=== 2027 Assembly election ===
2027 Manipur Legislative Assembly election: Wangkhem
Party	Candidate	Votes	%	±%
INC				
NDA				
NOTA	None of the above			
Majority				
Turnout				
gain from		Swing		

=== Assembly Election 2022 ===
2022 Manipur Legislative Assembly election: Wangkhem
Party	Candidate	Votes	%	±%
INC	Keisham Meghachandra Singh	8,889	29.36%	−10.16%
BJP	Yumnam Nabachandra Singh	7,597	25.09%	9.09%
RPI(A)	Dr. Nimai Chand Luwang	7,100	23.45%	
NPP	Kharibam Jiban Singh	3,474	11.47%	
JD(U)	Kangabam Jadu @ Jadumani Singh	2,891	9.55%	
Margin of victory		1,292	4.27%	−5.81%
Turnout		30,277	89.40%	−2.06%
Registered electors		33,866		8.38%
INC hold		Swing	-10.16%	

=== Assembly Election 2017 ===
2017 Manipur Legislative Assembly election: Wangkhem
Party	Candidate	Votes	%	±%
INC	Keisham Meghachandra Singh	11,293	39.52%	0.11%
NEIDP	Yumnam Nabachandra Singh	8,413	29.44%	
BJP	Oinam Haridas Singh	4,573	16.00%	
LJP	Kangabam Jadu Singh	3,986	13.95%	
NOTA	None of the Above	177	0.62%	
Margin of victory		2,880	10.08%	−2.29%
Turnout		28,578	91.46%	2.49%
Registered electors		31,247		16.31%
INC hold		Swing	0.11%	

=== Assembly Election 2012 ===
2012 Manipur Legislative Assembly election: Wangkhem
Party	Candidate	Votes	%	±%
INC	Keisham Meghachandra Singh	9,418	39.40%	−7.41%
MPP	Dr. Nimai Chand Luwang	6,462	27.04%	−6.61%
AITC	Md. Abdul Kadir	6,321	26.45%	
MSCP	Laishram Kadamjit Singh	1,699	7.11%	
Margin of victory		2,956	12.37%	−0.80%
Turnout		23,901	88.96%	−1.28%
Registered electors		26,866		5.09%
INC hold		Swing	-7.41%	

=== Assembly Election 2007 ===
2007 Manipur Legislative Assembly election: Wangkhem
Party	Candidate	Votes	%	±%
INC	Keisham Meghachandra Singh	10,801	46.81%	31.19%
MPP	Dr. Nimai Chand Luwang	7,762	33.64%	4.03%
RJD	Lisham Chandrakishor Singh	4,111	17.82%	
BJP	P. Munal Singh	215	0.93%	
NCP	Dr. Ibochouba Longjam	137	0.59%	
Margin of victory		3,039	13.17%	12.81%
Turnout		23,072	90.25%	−4.73%
Registered electors		25,565		15.31%
INC gain from MPP		Swing	17.20%	

=== Assembly Election 2002 ===
2002 Manipur Legislative Assembly election: Wangkhem
Party	Candidate	Votes	%	±%
MPP	Dr. Nimai Chand Luwang	6,139	29.61%	
MSCP	Thokchom Chandra Singh	6,065	29.25%	17.43%
INC	Sorokhaibam Joychandra Singh	3,239	15.62%	−20.02%
Manipur National Conference	Dr. Ibochouba Longjam	2,734	13.19%	
FPM	Laishram Kadamjit Singh	2,556	12.33%	−3.62%
Margin of victory		74	0.36%	−15.16%
Turnout		20,733	94.98%	0.91%
Registered electors		22,170		3.82%
MPP gain from INC		Swing	-14.69%	

=== Assembly Election 2000 ===
2000 Manipur Legislative Assembly election: Wangkhem
Party	Candidate	Votes	%	±%
INC	Dr. Nimai Chand Luwang	7,057	35.64%	−8.66%
SAP	Dr. Ibochouba Longjam	3,985	20.12%	−0.42%
FPM	L. Kadamjit Singh	3,159	15.95%	
BJP	Nongthombam Shamu Singh	3,136	15.84%	
MSCP	Pangambam Munal Singh	2,341	11.82%	
Margin of victory		3,072	15.51%	6.38%
Turnout		19,802	93.48%	−0.58%
Registered electors		21,354		11.78%
INC hold		Swing	-8.66%	

=== Assembly Election 1995 ===
1995 Manipur Legislative Assembly election: Wangkhem
Party	Candidate	Votes	%	±%
INC	Dr. Nimai Chand Luwang	7,873	44.30%	−15.88%
MPP	Longjam Ibotomba Singh	6,249	35.16%	−2.37%
SAP	Pangambam Munal Singh	3,651	20.54%	
Margin of victory		1,624	9.14%	−13.50%
Turnout		17,773	94.06%	−1.88%
Registered electors		19,103		−1.58%
INC hold		Swing	-15.88%	

=== Assembly Election 1990 ===
1990 Manipur Legislative Assembly election: Wangkhem
Party	Candidate	Votes	%	±%
INC	Nimaichand Luwang	11,022	60.17%	43.42%
MPP	Nongthombam Shamu Singh	6,875	37.53%	17.59%
Independent	Pangabam Ibothoi	420	2.29%	
Margin of victory		4,147	22.64%	15.77%
Turnout		18,317	95.94%	6.26%
Registered electors		19,410		8.49%
INC gain from Independent		Swing	33.36%	

=== Assembly Election 1984 ===
1984 Manipur Legislative Assembly election: Wangkhem
Party	Candidate	Votes	%	±%
Independent	Nahakpam Nimai Chand Luwang	4,193	26.81%	
MPP	Ibotonm Mazid	3,119	19.94%	18.48%
INC	Konsam Gulap	2,620	16.75%	
Independent	Kshetrimayum Biramangol	2,479	15.85%	
Independent	Pangambam Munal Singh	1,504	9.62%	
Independent	Nongthombam Shamu Singh	1,451	9.28%	
Independent	Koijan Kalabi	124	0.79%	
Margin of victory		1,074	6.87%	0.82%
Turnout		15,640	89.68%	1.47%
Registered electors		17,891		18.10%
Independent hold		Swing	3.92%	

=== Assembly Election 1980 ===
1980 Manipur Legislative Assembly election: Wangkhem
Party	Candidate	Votes	%	±%
Independent	Pangambam Munal Singh	2,991	22.89%	
Independent	Iboton	2,201	16.84%	
INC(U)	Konsam Gulap	2,114	16.18%	
Independent	Chakpram Angou	1,190	9.11%	
Independent	Sorokhaibam Chourajit	987	7.55%	
JP	Md. Chaoba	915	7.00%	
INC(I)	Laishram Modhu Singh	892	6.83%	
Independent	Chanam Badeswor	750	5.74%	
Independent	Thagjam Nongyal	493	3.77%	
Independent	Sijagurumayum Gopendra Sharma	278	2.13%	
MPP	Chungkham Janmajoy	191	1.46%	−22.26%
Margin of victory		790	6.05%	0.04%
Turnout		13,068	88.21%	−4.15%
Registered electors		15,149		22.71%
Independent gain from MPP		Swing	-0.84%	

=== Assembly Election 1974 ===
1974 Manipur Legislative Assembly election: Wangkhem
Party	Candidate	Votes	%	±%
MPP	Chaoba	2,641	23.73%	
INC	Laishram Modhu Singh	1,973	17.73%	
Independent	Thanjgam Jatra	1,827	16.41%	
Independent	Pangambam Munal Singh	1,704	15.31%	
Independent	Kongram Gulap Singh	1,573	14.13%	
INC(O)	Sorokhaibam Chourajit	1,413	12.69%	
Margin of victory		668	6.00%	
Turnout		11,131	92.36%	
Registered electors		12,345		
MPP win (new seat)				

== See also ==
- List of constituencies of the Manipur Legislative Assembly
- Thoubal district
