= Gaikhangam Gangmei =

Indian politician (born 1950)

2nd Deputy Chief Minister of Manipur
- In office 7 March 2012 – 15 March 2017
- Chief Minister: Okram Ibobi Singh
- Preceded by: Leishangthem Chandramani Singh
- Succeeded by: Yumnam Joykumar Singh

Member of the Manipur Legislative Assembly
- In office 2002–2022
- Preceded by: Gangmumei Kamei
- Succeeded by: Dinganglung Gangmei
- Constituency: Nungba
- In office 1984–1995
- Preceded by: Gaikhangam
- Succeeded by: Gangmumei Kamei
- Constituency: Nungba

President of Manipur Pradesh Congress Committee
- In office 5 February 2019 – 25 October 2019
- Preceded by: T. N. Haokip
- Succeeded by: Moirangthem Okendra

Personal details
- Born: 12 November 1950 (age 75) Gaidimjang Khoupum Village
- Party: Indian National Congress
- Spouse: Smt. Adiliu Gangmei
- Children: 4 Sons, 2 Daughters
- Parent: Late Shri Khangsillung
- Education: B. A
- Profession: Social Worker

Gaikhangam Gangmei (born 12 November 1950) is an Indian politician and member of Congress Working Committee. He served as second Deputy Chief Minister of Manipur from 2012-2017 and also as MPCC president.

== Personal life ==
Gangmei was born in Gaidimjang, Khoupum valley in the Rongmei Naga family of Khangsillung and Lansillung. The youngest of eight siblings, Gangmei at the age of 12 adopted Christianity along with his mother.

== History ==
- Elected MLA from 54-Nungba (ST) A/C, 3rd Manipur Legislative Assembly 1980
- Minister of State -- (Edn., Sw, Arts & Cult. & Sports) 1983-1984
- Elected MLA from 54-Nungba ST-A/C, 4th Manipur Legislative Assembly 1984
- Minister of State (Tribal Dev. & District Council) Manipur (Indep. Charge) 1985- 1988
- Minister of State, I.F.C.D., Manipur 1988-1990
- Elected MLA from 54-Nungba (ST) A/C 5th Manipur Legislative Assembly 1990
- Cabinet Minister, (Forest), Manipur 1992-1993
- Cabinet Minister, (Agri., Hort. & Soil Cons.) 1994
- Elected MLA from 54-Nungba (S/T) A/C the 4th term 2002
- Cabinet Minister, (Works), Manipur 2002-July 2004
- Cabinet Minister, (Power, HSC, IPR), Manipur 7-2000-Apr. 2006
- Elected President of MPCC 10 September 2005
- Deputy Chief Minister, Manipur (2012–17)
