= Keisham Meghachandra Singh =

Indian politician

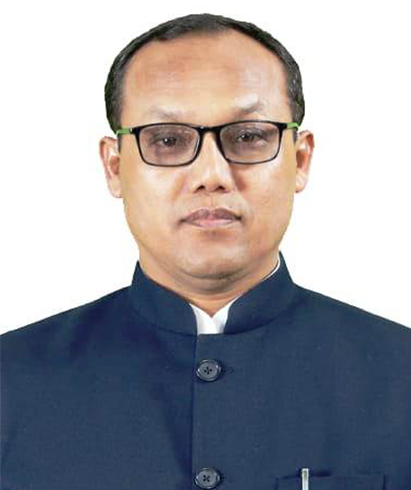

Leader of Congress Legislative Party, Manipur
- Incumbent
- Assumed office 5 February 2026
- Deputy: Kangujam Ranjit Singh
- Preceded by: Okram Ibobi Singh

President of Manipur Pradesh Congress Committee
- In office 30 March 2022 – 5 February 2026
- Preceded by: N Loken Singh
- Succeeded by: Okram Ibobi Singh

Member of the Manipur Legislative Assembly
- Incumbent
- Assumed office 2007
- Preceded by: Nimai Chand Luwang
- Constituency: Wangkhem

Personal details
- Born: 1 March 1973 (age 53) Yairipok
- Party: Indian National Congress
- Spouse: Smt. Keisham Ongbi Robita Devi
- Children: 2 Sons, 1 Daughter
- Parent: Keisham Kullabidhu Singh(Father) Keisham Chandramukhi Devi(Mother)
- Education: 1st Class (Hons) Graduate, M. A. (Pol.Sc.)
- Profession: Social Worker

Keisham Meghachandra Singh (born 1 March 1973) is an Indian politician from Manipur. and Member of Manipur Legislative Assembly from Wangkhem Assembly constituency. He won the 2017 Manipur Legislative Assembly election from Wangkhem, getting 11,293 votes against his nearest competitor NEIDP's Yumnam Nabachandra Singh's 8,413 votes.He served as President of the Manipur Pradesh Congress Committee from 2022 till 2026.

== Personal life ==
He was born on 1 March 1973 in Yairipok.
