= Uripok Assembly constituency =

Legislative Assembly constituency in Manipur State, India

Coordinates: 24.81°N 93.91°E

Uripok
- Constituency for the Manipur Legislative Assembly
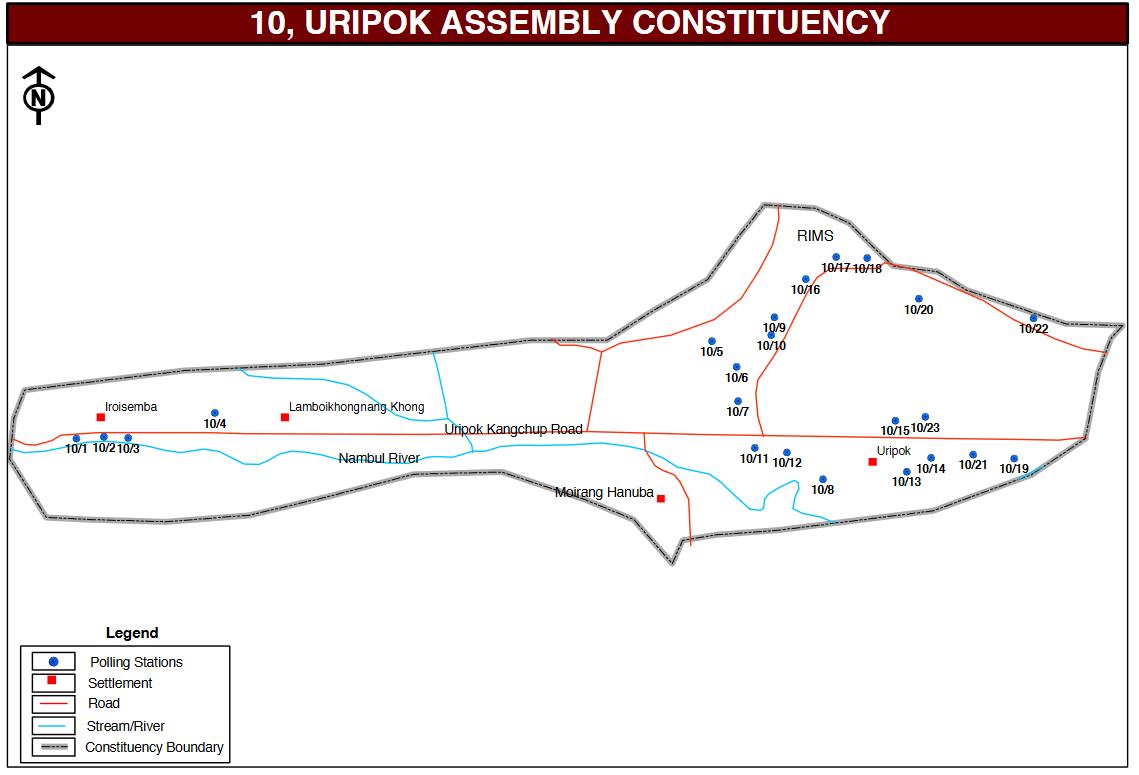

Constituency details
- Country: India
- Region: Northeast India
- State: Manipur
- District: Imphal West
- Lok Sabha constituency: Inner Manipur
- Established: 1967
- Total electors: 25,727
- Reservation: None

Member of Legislative Assembly
- 12th Manipur Legislative Assembly
- Incumbent Khwairakpam Raghumani Singh
- Party: Bharatiya Janata Party
- Elected year: 2022

Uripok Legislative Assembly constituency is one of the 60 Legislative Assembly constituencies of Manipur state in India.

It is part of Imphal West district.

== Extent ==
Uripok is the 10th of 60 assembly constituencies in Manipur. It consists of 35 parts namely: 1 - Iroishemba, 2 - Langol Lairembi Leikai, 3 - Langol Aying Leikai, Langol, 5 - Langol Ningthou, 6 - Iroishemba Mamang Leikai, 7 - Iroishemba Mayai Leikai, 8 - Lamboikhongnangkhong (A), 9 - Lamboikhongnangkhong (B), 10 - Uripok Naoremthong (A), 11 - Uripok Naoremthong (B), 12 - Uripok Naoremthong (C), 13 - Lamphel Sana Keithel Makha, 14 - Lamphel Sana Keithel Awang, 15 - Uripok Polem Leikai, 16 - Uripok Yambem Leikai, 17 - Uripok Khumanthem Leikai, 18 - Uripok Achom Leikai (A), 19 - Uripok Achom Leikai (B), 20 - Uripok Khaidem Leikai, 21 - Uripok Ahanthem Leikai, 22 - Uripok Khoisnam Leikai (A), 23 - Uripok Khoisnam Leikai (B), 24 - Uripok Sorbon Thingel Kabrabam Leikai, 25 - Uripok Sorbon Thingel Leirak, 26 - Uripok Bachaspati Leikai (A), 27 - Uripok Bachaspati Leikai (B), 28 - Uripok Bachaspati Leikai (C), 29 - Uripok Khwai Brahmapur (A), 30 - Nagamapal Singjubung Leirak, 31 - Uripok Khwai Brahmapur (B), 32 - Singjubung Leirak, 33 - Sorbol Thingel (A), 34 - Uripok Tourangbam Leikai, and 35 - Sorbol Thingel.

== Members of the Legislative Assembly ==
Year	Member	Party
1980	Paonam Achou Singh	Independent
1984	Paonam Achou Singh	Indian National Congress
1990	T. Gunadhwaja Singh	Indian National Congress
1995	N. Nodiachand	Manipur Peoples Party
2000	Paonam Achou Singh	Manipur State Congress Party
2002	Laishram Nandakumar Singh	Indian National Congress
2007	Laishram Nandakumar Singh	Indian National Congress
2012	Laishram Nandakumar Singh	Indian National Congress
2017	Yumnam Joykumar Singh	National People's Party
2022	Khwairakpam Raghumani Singh	Bharatiya Janata Party

== Election results ==
Vote share of winning candidates
2022	36.17%
2017	32.03%
2012	27.83%
2007	41.44%
2002	46.69%
2000	32.68%
1995	27.46%
1990	34.86%
1984	31.84%
1980	26.81%
1974	38.49%
1972	45.16%
1967	53.00%

=== 2027 Assembly election ===
2027 Manipur Legislative Assembly election: Uripok
Party	Candidate	Votes	%	±%
INC				
NDA				
NOTA	None of the above			
Majority				
Turnout				
gain from		Swing		

=== Assembly Election 2022 ===
2022 Manipur Legislative Assembly election: Uripok
Party	Candidate	Votes	%	±%
BJP	Khwairakpam Raghumani Singh	8,335	36.17%	6.53%
NPP	Yumnam Joykumar Singh	7,426	32.23%	
JD(U)	Khombongmayum Suresh Singh	5,472	23.75%	
INC	Nunglepam Mahananda Singh	1,540	6.68%	−23.64%
NOTA	Nota	268	1.16%	−0.24%
Margin of victory		909	3.95%	2.24%
Turnout		23,041	89.56%	4.57%
Registered electors		25,727		8.27%
BJP gain from NPP		Swing	4.14%	

=== Assembly Election 2017 ===
2017 Manipur Legislative Assembly election: Uripok
Party	Candidate	Votes	%	±%
NPP	Yumnam Joykumar Singh	6,469	32.03%	
INC	Laishram Nandakumar Singh	6,124	30.32%	2.50%
BJP	Dr. Nameirakpam Dwijamani Singh	5,986	29.64%	20.36%
LJP	Nameirakpam Santosh Singh	1,332	6.60%	
NOTA	None of the Above	284	1.41%	
Margin of victory		345	1.71%	−4.50%
Turnout		20,195	84.99%	3.53%
Registered electors		23,762		10.74%
NPP gain from INC		Swing	4.21%	

=== Assembly Election 2012 ===
2012 Manipur Legislative Assembly election: Uripok
Party	Candidate	Votes	%	±%
INC	L. Nandakumar Singh	4,864	27.83%	−13.61%
Independent	N. Dwijamani Singh	3,779	21.62%	
MSCP	N. Shyamananda Singh	3,712	21.24%	
JD(U)	Santosh Nameirakpam	1,734	9.92%	
BJP	Doctor Nando Ningthoukhongjam	1,623	9.28%	6.12%
AITC	Naorem Ibema Devi	1,357	7.76%	
NCP	Achou Singh Paonam	401	2.29%	0.80%
Margin of victory		1,085	6.21%	0.66%
Turnout		17,480	81.41%	0.04%
Registered electors		21,458		2.45%
INC hold		Swing	-13.61%	

=== Assembly Election 2007 ===
2007 Manipur Legislative Assembly election: Uripok
Party	Candidate	Votes	%	±%
INC	Laishram Nandakumar Singh	7,066	41.44%	−5.25%
MPP	P. Achou Singh	6,120	35.89%	34.17%
RJD	Dr. Nando Singh	2,132	12.50%	
CPI	N. Tombi Raj	798	4.68%	
BJP	Laimayum Raghumani Sharma	540	3.17%	1.73%
NCP	Ningthoukhongjam Radhakanta Singh	255	1.50%	−0.89%
SAP	Nameirakpam Nodiachand Singh	141	0.83%	
Margin of victory		946	5.55%	−9.69%
Turnout		17,052	81.42%	−0.72%
Registered electors		20,944		13.25%
INC hold		Swing	-5.25%	

=== Assembly Election 2002 ===
2002 Manipur Legislative Assembly election: Uripok
Party	Candidate	Votes	%	±%
INC	Laishram Nandakumar Singh	7,037	46.69%	
FPM	P. Achou Singh	4,740	31.45%	0.96%
DRPP	Ningthoukhongjam Tombi Raj	1,637	10.86%	
MSCP	Khongbantabam Jadumani	822	5.45%	−27.22%
NCP	N. Radhakanta	360	2.39%	1.67%
MPP	Nameirakpam Nodiachand Singh	260	1.72%	−15.58%
BJP	Konthoujam Surchand Singh	217	1.44%	−9.16%
Margin of victory		2,297	15.24%	13.05%
Turnout		15,073	82.13%	−3.63%
Registered electors		18,494		4.21%
INC gain from MSCP		Swing	19.22%	

=== Assembly Election 2000 ===
2000 Manipur Legislative Assembly election: Uripok
Party	Candidate	Votes	%	±%
MSCP	P. Achou Singh	4,866	32.68%	
FPM	Laishram Nandakumar Singh	4,540	30.49%	5.28%
MPP	Nameirakpam Nodiachand Singh	2,577	17.30%	−10.16%
BJP	Takhellambam Gunadhwaja	1,579	10.60%	−2.53%
Independent	N. Tombi Raj	984	6.61%	
SAP	N. Radhakanta Singh	239	1.60%	
NCP	M. Birendra Sharma	107	0.72%	
Margin of victory		326	2.19%	−0.06%
Turnout		14,892	84.81%	−0.96%
Registered electors		17,747		13.32%
MSCP gain from MPP		Swing	5.21%	

=== Assembly Election 1995 ===
1995 Manipur Legislative Assembly election: Uripok
Party	Candidate	Votes	%	±%
MPP	N. Nodiachand Singh	3,646	27.46%	3.12%
FPM	Laishram Nandakumar Singh	3,347	25.21%	
INC	Paonam Achaou Singh	3,151	23.73%	−11.13%
BJP	Chongtham Bijoy Singh	1,743	13.13%	
JD	Meinam Mithai Singh	730	5.50%	
CPI	Chirom Kamal	659	4.96%	
Margin of victory		299	2.25%	−4.75%
Turnout		13,276	85.77%	2.82%
Registered electors		15,661		7.57%
MPP gain from INC		Swing	-7.40%	

=== Assembly Election 1990 ===
1990 Manipur Legislative Assembly election: Uripok
Party	Candidate	Votes	%	±%
INC	T. Gunadhwaja Singh	4,159	34.86%	3.03%
INS(SCS)	Achou Singh Paonam	3,324	27.86%	
MPP	Nameirakpam Nodiachand Singh	2,904	24.34%	
JD	Laimayum Raghumani Sharma	1,093	9.16%	
Independent	Lamabam Pardeshi	291	2.44%	
NPP	L. Megha Barna	158	1.32%	
Margin of victory		835	7.00%	2.43%
Turnout		11,929	82.95%	3.53%
Registered electors		14,559		23.77%
INC hold		Swing	3.03%	

=== Assembly Election 1984 ===
1984 Manipur Legislative Assembly election: Uripok
Party	Candidate	Votes	%	±%
INC	Paonam Achaou Singh	2,883	31.84%	
Independent	T. Gunadhwaja Singh	2,469	27.26%	
BJP	L. Rachumani Singh	1,717	18.96%	
Independent	Nameirakpam Nodiachand Singh	1,145	12.64%	
CPI	Thiyam Meghachandra Singh	643	7.10%	−4.45%
Independent	Ningthoukhonjam Dorendra	199	2.20%	
Margin of victory		414	4.57%	−6.68%
Turnout		9,056	79.42%	7.18%
Registered electors		11,763		3.44%
INC gain from Independent		Swing	5.02%	

=== Assembly Election 1980 ===
1980 Manipur Legislative Assembly election: Uripok
Party	Candidate	Votes	%	±%
Independent	Paonam Achaou Singh	2,140	26.81%	
JP	L. Rachumani Singh	1,242	15.56%	
MPP	L. Gokulchandra	1,147	14.37%	−21.01%
INC(I)	M. Meghachandra Singh	1,088	13.63%	
CPI	Thiyam Meghachandra Singh	922	11.55%	−26.94%
INC(U)	N. Tombi Singh	568	7.12%	
Independent	Kh. Ibochouba	470	5.89%	
Independent	Konthoujam Mangi	311	3.90%	
Independent	R. K. Gambhir Singh	53	0.66%	
Margin of victory		898	11.25%	8.14%
Turnout		7,981	72.24%	−3.47%
Registered electors		11,372		26.16%
Independent gain from CPI		Swing	-11.68%	

=== Assembly Election 1974 ===
1974 Manipur Legislative Assembly election: Uripok
Party	Candidate	Votes	%	±%
CPI	M. Meghachandra Singh	2,547	38.49%	−6.67%
MPP	Laisram Jugeswar Singh	2,341	35.38%	31.54%
Independent	Yambem Tajendra Singh	1,307	19.75%	
Independent	Soibam Gulap Singh	422	6.38%	
Margin of victory		206	3.11%	−10.24%
Turnout		6,617	75.70%	0.24%
Registered electors		9,014		9.70%
CPI hold		Swing	-6.67%	

=== Assembly Election 1972 ===
1972 Manipur Legislative Assembly election: Uripok
Party	Candidate	Votes	%	±%
CPI	M. Meghachandra Singh	2,743	45.16%	
INC	Khaidem Rajmani	1,932	31.81%	−21.19%
INC(O)	K. Ibetombi Singh	1,166	19.20%	
MPP	Dwijamani Sharma	233	3.84%	
Margin of victory		811	13.35%	−16.55%
Turnout		6,074	75.47%	12.00%
Registered electors		8,217		−54.09%
CPI gain from INC		Swing	-7.84%	

=== Assembly Election 1967 ===
1967 Manipur Legislative Assembly election: Uripok
Party	Candidate	Votes	%	±%
INC	N. Tombi Singh	5,841	53.00%	
SSP	R. K. Upendra	2,546	23.10%	
Independent	N. Tompok	2,075	18.83%	
Independent	S. Indramani	559	5.07%	
Margin of victory		3,295	29.90%	
Turnout		11,021	63.46%	
Registered electors		17,899		
INC win (new seat)				

== See also ==
- List of constituencies of the Manipur Legislative Assembly
- Imphal West district
