= T. N. Haokip =

Indian politician

T.N. Haokip

President of Manipur Pradesh Congress Committee
- In office 29 March 2016 – 5 February 2019
- Preceded by: Gaikhangam Gangmei
- Succeeded by: Gaikhangam Gangmei

Member of the Manipur Legislative Assembly
- In office 2002–2022
- Preceded by: M. Chungkhosei
- Succeeded by: Paolienlal Haokip
- Constituency: Saikot

Personal details
- Party: Indian National Congress
- Education: M.A.
- Occupation: Former Editor of Thinglhang Post, Politician

Telsing Ngamjang Haokip is former Minister of Manipur and former president of the Manipur Pradesh Congress Committee. He had been consistently elected six times from 59 Saikot(ST) Assembly constituency in Churachandpur district, until his defeat in 2022.

== History ==
- Elected MLA from 59 Saikot(ST) A/C, 5th Manipur Legislative Assembly 1990
- Elected MLA from 59 Saikot(ST) A/C, 6th Manipur Legislative Assembly 1995
- Elected MLA from 59 Saikot(ST) A/C, 8th Manipur Legislative Assembly 2002
- Elected MLA from 59 Saikot(ST) A/C, 9th Manipur Legislative Assembly 2007
- Elected MLA from 59 Saikot(ST) A/C, 10th Manipur Legislative Assembly 2012
- Elected MLA from 59 Saikot(ST) A/C, 11th Manipur Legislative Assembly 2017
- President, Manipur Pradesh Congress Committee, since 2 April 2016.
- Lost in 2022
