= Dinganglung Gangmei =

Indian politician

Member of the Manipur Legislative Assembly
- Incumbent
- Assumed office 2022
- Preceded by: Gaikhangam
- Constituency: Nungba

Personal details
- Born: 1 January 1979 (age 47) Gaidimjang Village
- Party: Bhartiya Janata Party
- Parent: Thanjikpou (father)
- Education: M.Sc
- Alma mater: Jawaharlal Nehru University
- Profession: Social Worker

Dinganglung Gangmei, also known as Dipu Gangmei, is an Indian bureaucrat turned politician. He was an IAS officer before taking voluntary retirement to contest an election in January 2022. He was elected to the Manipur Legislative Assembly from Nungba in the 2022 Manipur Assembly election, defeating the six-times MLA and Congress Working Committee member Gaikhangam. On 11 April 2022, he was elected chairman of the Hill Area committee of the Manipur Legislative Assembly.
