= Nungba Assembly constituency =

Legislative Assembly constituency in Manipur State, India

Coordinates: 24.75°N 93.42°E

Nungba
- Constituency for the Manipur Legislative Assembly

Constituency details
- Country: India
- Region: Northeast India
- State: Manipur
- District: Tamenglong
- Lok Sabha constituency: Outer Manipur
- Established: 1972
- Total electors: 29,510
- Reservation: ST

Member of Legislative Assembly
- 12th Manipur Legislative Assembly
- Incumbent Dinganglung Gangmei
- Party: Bharatiya Janata Party
- Elected year: 2022

Nungba is one of the 60 Vidhan Sabha constituencies in the Indian state of Manipur.

It is part of Tamenglong district and is reserved for candidates belonging to the Scheduled Tribes.

== Members of the Legislative Assembly ==
Year	Member	Party
1972	Kalanlung	Indian National Congress
1974	Jangamlung	Manipur Hills Union
1980	Saikhangam	Independent politician
1984	Gaikhangam Gangmei	Indian National Congress
1990	Gaikhangam Gangmei	Indian National Congress
1995	Gangmumei Kamei	Federal Party of Manipur
2000	Gangmumei Kamei	Federal Party of Manipur
2002	Gaikhangam Gangmei	Indian National Congress
2007	Gaikhangam Gangmei	Indian National Congress
2012	Gaikhangam Gangmei	Indian National Congress
2017	Gaikhangam Gangmei	Indian National Congress
2022	Dinganglung Gangmei	Bharatiya Janata Party

== Election results ==
Vote share of winning candidates
2022	57.39%
2017	52.16%
2012	53.67%
2007	63.85%
2002	45.37%
2000	42.38%
1995	36.59%
1990	52.03%
1984	54.07%
1980	31.50%
1974	23.67%
1972	38.41%

=== 2027 Assembly election ===
2027 Manipur Legislative Assembly election: Nungba
Party	Candidate	Votes	%	±%
INC				
NDA				
NOTA	None of the above			
Majority				
Turnout				
gain from		Swing		

=== Assembly Election 2022 ===
2022 Manipur Legislative Assembly election: Nungba
Party	Candidate	Votes	%	±%
BJP	Dinganglung Gangmei	14,464	57.39%	31.41%
INC	Gaikhangam Gangmei	10,678	42.37%	−9.79%
Margin of victory		3,786	15.02%	−11.16%
Turnout		25,201	85.40%	7.98%
Registered electors		29,510		16.22%
BJP gain from INC		Swing	5.23%	

=== Assembly Election 2017 ===
2017 Manipur Legislative Assembly election: Nungba
Party	Candidate	Votes	%	±%
INC	Gaikhangam Gangmei	10,255	52.16%	−1.50%
BJP	Adim Pamei	5,108	25.98%	
LJP	Pou Mathiupuang Gonmei	4,111	20.91%	
AITC	Kamei William Kabui	110	0.56%	
Margin of victory		5,147	26.18%	12.35%
Turnout		19,659	77.42%	2.84%
Registered electors		25,392		12.42%
INC hold		Swing	-1.50%	

=== Assembly Election 2012 ===
2012 Manipur Legislative Assembly election: Nungba
Party	Candidate	Votes	%	±%
INC	Gaikhangam Gangmei	9,040	53.67%	−10.18%
MSCP	Adim Pamei	6,710	39.84%	
NPF	G. Gaingam	1,092	6.48%	
Margin of victory		2,330	13.83%	−16.91%
Turnout		16,844	74.57%	−11.65%
Registered electors		22,586		7.23%
INC hold		Swing	-10.18%	

=== Assembly Election 2007 ===
2007 Manipur Legislative Assembly election: Nungba
Party	Candidate	Votes	%	±%
INC	Gaikhangam Gangmei	11,595	63.85%	18.47%
Independent	Gangmumei Kamei	6,012	33.10%	
Independent	Sangamlung	439	2.42%	
LJP	Khamkhogin Thangjom	115	0.63%	
Margin of victory		5,583	30.74%	24.94%
Turnout		18,161	86.22%	−3.20%
Registered electors		21,063		22.12%
INC hold		Swing	18.47%	

=== Assembly Election 2002 ===
2002 Manipur Legislative Assembly election: Nungba
Party	Candidate	Votes	%	±%
INC	Gaikhangam Gangmei	6,977	45.37%	9.68%
FPM	Prof. Gangmumei Kamei	6,085	39.57%	−2.81%
BJP	Ashinpou Gangmei	1,679	10.92%	3.79%
NCP	Amu Kamei	636	4.14%	−5.98%
Margin of victory		892	5.80%	−0.89%
Turnout		15,377	89.42%	0.68%
Registered electors		17,248		2.37%
INC gain from FPM		Swing	8.78%	

=== Assembly Election 2000 ===
2000 Manipur Legislative Assembly election: Nungba
Party	Candidate	Votes	%	±%
FPM	Gangmumei Kamei	6,282	42.38%	5.79%
INC	Gaikhangam Gangmei	5,291	35.70%	0.65%
NCP	Amu Kamei	1,500	10.12%	
BJP	Ashinpou Gangmei	1,057	7.13%	
Independent	L. Haopu Haokip	532	3.59%	
Margin of victory		991	6.69%	5.14%
Turnout		14,822	88.39%	−0.35%
Registered electors		16,849		8.59%
FPM hold		Swing	5.79%	

=== Assembly Election 1995 ===
1995 Manipur Legislative Assembly election: Nungba
Party	Candidate	Votes	%	±%
FPM	Gangmumei Kamei	4,982	36.59%	
INC	Gaikhangam Gangmei	4,772	35.05%	−16.98%
MPP	P. Gaijinlung	2,431	17.86%	
JD	Amu Kamei	1,430	10.50%	
Margin of victory		210	1.54%	−2.52%
Turnout		13,615	88.73%	−5.79%
Registered electors		15,516		−8.40%
FPM gain from INC		Swing	-15.44%	

=== Assembly Election 1990 ===
1990 Manipur Legislative Assembly election: Nungba
Party	Candidate	Votes	%	±%
INC	Gaikhangam Gangmei	8,235	52.03%	−2.04%
JD	Gangmumei Kamei	7,592	47.97%	
Margin of victory		643	4.06%	−4.08%
Turnout		15,827	94.53%	10.47%
Registered electors		16,939		16.56%
INC hold		Swing	-2.04%	

=== Assembly Election 1984 ===
1984 Manipur Legislative Assembly election: Nungba
Party	Candidate	Votes	%	±%
INC	Gaikhangam Gangmei	6,484	54.07%	
Independent	Gangmumei Kamei	5,508	45.93%	
Margin of victory		976	8.14%	0.15%
Turnout		11,992	84.06%	7.03%
Registered electors		14,532		18.34%
INC gain from Independent		Swing	22.57%	

=== Assembly Election 1980 ===
1980 Manipur Legislative Assembly election: Nungba
Party	Candidate	Votes	%	±%
Independent	Saikhangam	2,905	31.50%	
JP	Jangamlung	2,168	23.51%	
Independent	G. Gaingam	2,064	22.38%	
INC(I)	Kalanlung	1,951	21.15%	
INC(U)	Sehkam	135	1.46%	
Margin of victory		737	7.99%	7.19%
Turnout		9,223	77.03%	−0.38%
Registered electors		12,280		36.46%
Independent gain from Manipur Hills Union		Swing	7.83%	

=== Assembly Election 1974 ===
1974 Manipur Legislative Assembly election: Nungba
Party	Candidate	Votes	%	±%
Manipur Hills Union	Jangamlung	1,618	23.67%	
Independent	Pougailungpou	1,563	22.86%	
INC	Kalanlung	1,545	22.60%	−15.81%
Independent	Kamtinlal	1,424	20.83%	
Independent	Namtiang	619	9.06%	
Independent	Jamkhokam	49	0.72%	
Margin of victory		55	0.80%	−12.87%
Turnout		6,836	77.41%	23.95%
Registered electors		8,999		27.97%
Manipur Hills Union gain from INC		Swing	-14.74%	

=== Assembly Election 1972 ===
1972 Manipur Legislative Assembly election: Nungba
Party	Candidate	Votes	%	±%
INC	Kalanlung	1,374	38.41%	
Independent	Pougailungpou	885	24.74%	
Independent	K. Huriang	540	15.10%	
Independent	Satkholal Neisheil	490	13.70%	
Independent	Champadik	288	8.05%	
Margin of victory		489	13.67%	
Turnout		3,577	53.46%	
Registered electors		7,032		
INC win (new seat)				

== See also ==
- Manipur Legislative Assembly
- List of constituencies of Manipur Legislative Assembly
- Tamenglong district
