= Khwairakpam Raghumani Singh =

Indian politician

Member of the Manipur Legislative Assembly

Khwairakpam Raghumani Singh (born 1962) is an Indian politician from Manipur. He is an MLA from Uripok Assembly constituency in Imphal West District. He won the 2022 Manipur Legislative Assembly election, representing the Bharatiya Janata Party. He was formerly in the Indian Administrative Service.

== Early life and education ==
Singh is from Uripok Kabrabam Leikai, Lamphel tehsil, Imphal West District, Manipur. He is the son of late Khwairakpam Tompokmacha Singh. He completed his bachelor's degree in Engineering in Agriculture in 1984 at Tamil Nadu Agricultural University. He married, Momtaz Thingujam, a Senior Assistant Professor in the Computer Science Department of Manipur University. They have two children, Thajana Devi Khwairakpam and Lincoln Khwairakpam.

== Career ==
Singh won from Uripok Assembly constituency representing the Bharatiya Janata Party in the 2022 Manipur Legislative Assembly election. He polled 8,335 votes and defeated his nearest rival, Yumnam Joykumar Singh of the National People's Party, by a margin of 909 votes. He is a retired IAS officer and he resigned his post as the chairman of the Manipur Renewable Energy Development Agency in April 2023. He is the fourth officer to resign from an administrative post in a month.
