= Saikot Assembly constituency =

Legislative Assembly constituency in Manipur State, India

Coordinates: 24.33°N 93.73°E

Saikot
- Constituency for the Manipur Legislative Assembly

Constituency details
- Country: India
- Region: Northeast India
- State: Manipur
- District: Churachandpur
- Lok Sabha constituency: Outer Manipur
- Established: 1974
- Total electors: 62,613
- Reservation: ST

Member of Legislative Assembly
- 12th Manipur Legislative Assembly
- Incumbent Paolienlal Haokip
- Party: Bharatiya Janata Party

Saikot is one of the 60 Legislative Assembly constituencies of Manipur state in India.

It is part of Churachandpur district and is reserved for candidates belonging to the Scheduled Tribes.

== Members of the Legislative Assembly ==
Year	Member	Party
2002	T. N. Haokip	Indian National Congress
2007	T. N. Haokip	Indian National Congress
2012	T. N. Haokip	Indian National Congress
2017	T. N. Haokip	Indian National Congress
2022	Paolienlal Haokip	Bharatiya Janata Party

== Election results ==
Vote share of winning candidates
2022	35.10%
2017	48.25%
2012	45.60%
2007	36.22%
2002	51.84%
2000	29.21%
1995	30.65%
1990	34.36%
1984	36.11%
1980	28.30%
1974	27.91%

=== 2027 Assembly election ===
2027 Manipur Legislative Assembly election: Saikot
Party	Candidate	Votes	%	±%
INC				
NDA				
NOTA	None of the above			
Majority				
Turnout				
gain from		Swing		

=== Assembly Election 2022 ===
2022 Manipur Legislative Assembly election: Saikot
Party	Candidate	Votes	%	±%
BJP	Paolienlal Haokip	18,457	35.10%	1.89%
NPP	Khaipao Haokip	12,586	23.93%	
INC	T. N. Haokip	10,250	19.49%	−28.76%
Independent	Karong Onkholer	5,169	9.83%	
NCP	George T. Haokip	4,796	9.12%	
KNA	Joshua Thiek	837	1.59%	
Margin of victory		5,871	11.16%	−3.89%
Turnout		52,590	83.99%	17.39%
Registered electors		62,613		23.04%
BJP gain from INC		Swing	-13.16%	

=== Assembly Election 2017 ===
2017 Manipur Legislative Assembly election: Saikot
Party	Candidate	Votes	%	±%
INC	T. N. Haokip	16,354	48.25%	2.66%
BJP	Paokholal Haokip	11,253	33.20%	16.86%
LJP	Holkholun Lhungdim	6,096	17.99%	
NOTA	None of the Above	189	0.56%	
Margin of victory		5,101	15.05%	−12.13%
Turnout		33,892	66.60%	0.99%
Registered electors		50,889		11.26%
INC hold		Swing	2.66%	

=== Assembly Election 2012 ===
2012 Manipur Legislative Assembly election: Saikot
Party	Candidate	Votes	%	±%
INC	T. N. Haokip	13,684	45.60%	9.38%
AITC	Lunkholal	5,527	18.42%	
BJP	M. Chungkhosei Haokip	4,905	16.34%	15.38%
NCP	Lalthalien	4,864	16.21%	−9.81%
NPP	K. William Vaiphei	900	3.00%	
Margin of victory		8,157	27.18%	16.98%
Turnout		30,010	65.61%	−20.85%
Registered electors		45,739		10.10%
INC hold		Swing	9.38%	

=== Assembly Election 2007 ===
2007 Manipur Legislative Assembly election: Saikot
Party	Candidate	Votes	%	±%
INC	T. N. Haokip	13,010	36.22%	−15.62%
NCP	Lalthalien	9,347	26.02%	−11.13%
LJP	M. Chungkhosei Haokip	9,092	25.31%	
MPP	Dr. Jainson Haokip	3,983	11.09%	
BJP	Ngamkholun	347	0.97%	−1.34%
Margin of victory		3,663	10.20%	−4.50%
Turnout		35,919	86.46%	−6.13%
Registered electors		41,543		18.15%
INC hold		Swing	-15.62%	

=== Assembly Election 2002 ===
2002 Manipur Legislative Assembly election: Saikot
Party	Candidate	Votes	%	±%
INC	T. N. Haokip	16,699	51.84%	
NCP	M. Chungkhosei Haokip	11,966	37.15%	21.25%
SAP	Albert Gen Goukhup Mate	2,001	6.21%	1.89%
BJP	Selkai Hrangchal	742	2.30%	
Independent	K. Lalkhopao Kom	438	1.36%	
FPM	D. Jangkhongam	366	1.14%	−2.87%
Margin of victory		4,733	14.69%	8.05%
Turnout		32,212	92.59%	3.42%
Registered electors		35,162		1.43%
INC gain from MSCP		Swing	21.20%	

=== Assembly Election 2000 ===
2000 Manipur Legislative Assembly election: Saikot
Party	Candidate	Votes	%	±%
MSCP	M. Chungkhosei Haokip	9,286	29.21%	
MPP	T. N. Haokip	7,174	22.57%	−8.08%
Independent	L. Ngaium	6,788	21.35%	
NCP	Gengoukhup Mate	5,054	15.90%	
SAP	Ngukholun Haokip	1,373	4.32%	0.22%
FPM	Hathoi Buansing	1,274	4.01%	−3.43%
Margin of victory		2,112	6.64%	2.05%
Turnout		31,787	92.64%	3.47%
Registered electors		34,666		4.91%
MSCP gain from MPP		Swing	-1.43%	

=== Assembly Election 1995 ===
1995 Manipur Legislative Assembly election: Saikot
Party	Candidate	Votes	%	±%
MPP	T. N. Haokip	8,938	30.65%	
JD	Ngulkhohao Lhungdim	7,599	26.05%	
NPP	T. Kholly	7,347	25.19%	
FPM	Thangkhenkhup	2,168	7.43%	
SAP	Khailam	1,197	4.10%	
INC	Lalhmingthanga	1,082	3.71%	−22.38%
Independent	Henjakhup	487	1.67%	
KNA	Lalkhopao Kom	329	1.13%	
Margin of victory		1,339	4.59%	−2.49%
Turnout		29,166	89.18%	−2.48%
Registered electors		33,045		40.56%
MPP gain from KNA		Swing	-3.72%	

=== Assembly Election 1990 ===
1990 Manipur Legislative Assembly election: Saikot
Party	Candidate	Votes	%	±%
KNA	T. N. Haokip	7,267	34.36%	
JD	Vanlainghak F. Tusing	5,770	27.29%	
INC	Ngulkhohao	5,518	26.09%	−2.76%
INS(SCS)	Songboi	2,274	10.75%	
Manipur Hill People'S Council	Khaikholam	318	1.50%	
Margin of victory		1,497	7.08%	6.00%
Turnout		21,147	91.66%	−0.70%
Registered electors		23,509		53.35%
KNA gain from MPP		Swing	-1.74%	

=== Assembly Election 1984 ===
1984 Manipur Legislative Assembly election: Saikot
Party	Candidate	Votes	%	±%
MPP	Ngulkhohao	5,005	36.11%	34.39%
Independent	Lala Khobung	4,856	35.03%	
INC	K. Lalkhopaokom	4,000	28.86%	
Margin of victory		149	1.07%	−5.81%
Turnout		13,861	92.36%	8.85%
Registered electors		15,330		−4.94%
MPP gain from Independent		Swing	7.81%	

=== Assembly Election 1980 ===
1980 Manipur Legislative Assembly election: Saikot
Party	Candidate	Votes	%	±%
Independent	Ngulkhohau	3,719	28.30%	
Independent	T. Kholly	2,814	21.41%	
KNA	Thangkhosei Haokip	2,335	17.77%	
Independent	K. T. Lala	1,678	12.77%	
INC(I)	K. Lalkhopao Kom	1,055	8.03%	
INC(U)	Jangkhosei Mante	922	7.02%	
JP	Thangkhanpao	332	2.53%	
MPP	Meiteiton	226	1.72%	
Margin of victory		905	6.89%	1.25%
Turnout		13,142	83.51%	−12.23%
Registered electors		16,126		30.69%
Independent gain from KNA		Swing	0.39%	

=== Assembly Election 1974 ===
1974 Manipur Legislative Assembly election: Saikot
Party	Candidate	Votes	%	±%
KNA	Ngulkhohao	3,245	27.91%	
Independent	T. Kholly	2,590	22.27%	
INC	Lhingjaneng	2,121	18.24%	
Independent	L. Kishemzhang Kom	1,759	15.13%	
Independent	K. T. Laila	1,494	12.85%	
Independent	Nengzasoi	381	3.28%	
Margin of victory		655	5.63%	
Turnout		11,628	95.74%	
Registered electors		12,339		
KNA win (new seat)				

== See also ==
- List of constituencies of the Manipur Legislative Assembly
- Churachandpur district
