= Sugnu Assembly constituency =

Legislative Assembly constituency in Manipur State, India

Coordinates: 24.29°N 93.88°E

Sugnu
- Constituency for the Manipur Legislative Assembly

Constituency details
- Country: India
- Region: Northeast India
- State: Manipur
- District: Thoubal
- Lok Sabha constituency: Outer Manipur
- Established: 1972
- Total electors: 28,268
- Reservation: None

Member of Legislative Assembly
- 12th Manipur Legislative Assembly
- Incumbent Kangujam Ranjit Singh
- Party: INC
- Alliance: MPSA
- Elected year: 2022

Sugnu Legislative Assembly constituency is one of the 60 Legislative Assembly constituencies of Manipur state in India.

It is part of Thoubal district.

== Members of the Legislative Assembly ==
Year	Member	Party
1984	Mayanglambam Babu Singh	Indian National Congress
1990	Loitongbam Ibomcha Singh	Janata Dal
1995	Mayanglambam Babu Singh	Janata Dal
2000	Kangujam Ranjit Singh	Bharatiya Janata Party
2002	Kangujam Ranjit Singh	Indian National Congress
2007	Kangujam Ranjit Singh	Indian National Congress
2012	Kangujam Ranjit Singh	Indian National Congress
2017	Kangujam Ranjit Singh	Indian National Congress
2022	Kangujam Ranjit Singh	Indian National Congress

== Election results ==
Vote share of winning candidates
2022	50.63%
2017	56.19%
2012	58.00%
2007	54.21%
2002	38.47%
2000	27.30%
1995	25.37%
1990	43.44%
1984	29.30%
1980	31.07%
1974	41.84%
1972	37.60%

=== 2027 Assembly election ===
2027 Manipur Legislative Assembly election: Sugnu
Party	Candidate	Votes	%	±%
INC				
NDA				
NOTA	None of the above			
Majority				
Turnout				
gain from		Swing		

=== Assembly Election 2022 ===
2022 Manipur Legislative Assembly election: Sugnu
Party	Candidate	Votes	%	±%
INC	Kangujam Ranjit Singh	12,673	50.63%	−5.56%
BJP	Mayanglambam Binod	11,657	46.57%	3.59%
Independent	Kakyenpaibam Muktasana Singh	555	2.22%	
NOTA	Nota	146	0.58%	−0.24%
Margin of victory		1,016	4.06%	−9.15%
Turnout		25,031	88.55%	−0.06%
Registered electors		28,268		5.58%
INC hold		Swing	-5.56%	

=== Assembly Election 2017 ===
2017 Manipur Legislative Assembly election: Sugnu
Party	Candidate	Votes	%	±%
INC	Kangujam Ranjit Singh	13,331	56.19%	−1.81%
BJP	Yumnam Jiban Singh	10,198	42.98%	35.19%
NOTA	None of the Above	196	0.83%	
Margin of victory		3,133	13.21%	−26.80%
Turnout		23,725	88.61%	1.93%
Registered electors		26,775		16.72%
INC hold		Swing	-1.81%	

=== Assembly Election 2012 ===
2012 Manipur Legislative Assembly election: Sugnu
Party	Candidate	Votes	%	±%
INC	Kangujam Ranjit Singh	11,534	58.00%	3.80%
CPI	Yumnam Jiban Singh	3,579	18.00%	
MPP	Mayanglambam Binod	3,221	16.20%	−13.17%
BJP	Khaidem Sharat Singh	1,549	7.79%	
Margin of victory		7,955	40.01%	15.16%
Turnout		19,885	86.67%	1.62%
Registered electors		22,940		−7.37%
INC hold		Swing	3.80%	

=== Assembly Election 2007 ===
2007 Manipur Legislative Assembly election: Sugnu
Party	Candidate	Votes	%	±%
INC	Kangujam Ranjit Singh	11,420	54.21%	15.74%
MPP	Mayanglambam Binod	6,186	29.36%	
RJD	Khwairakpam Iboyaima	3,302	15.67%	
LJP	Achou Singh Sorokhaibam	159	0.75%	
Margin of victory		5,234	24.84%	16.21%
Turnout		21,067	85.06%	−4.34%
Registered electors		24,766		15.49%
INC hold		Swing	15.74%	

=== Assembly Election 2002 ===
2002 Manipur Legislative Assembly election: Sugnu
Party	Candidate	Votes	%	±%
INC	Kangujam Ranjit Singh	7,318	38.47%	32.51%
DRPP	Khwairakpam Iboyaima	5,675	29.83%	
MSCP	Khumukcham Raghumani Singh	3,658	19.23%	−5.66%
FPM	Mayanglambam Babu Singh	1,917	10.08%	
BJP	Thingnam Sanayaima Singh	394	2.07%	−25.23%
Margin of victory		1,643	8.64%	6.22%
Turnout		19,024	89.40%	−2.73%
Registered electors		21,444		2.75%
INC gain from BJP		Swing	13.09%	

=== Assembly Election 2000 ===
2000 Manipur Legislative Assembly election: Sugnu
Party	Candidate	Votes	%	±%
BJP	Kangujam Ranjit Singh	5,204	27.30%	8.50%
MSCP	Mayanglambam Babu Singh	4,743	24.88%	
MPP	Khumukcham Raghumani Singh	4,504	23.63%	5.31%
SAP	Khwairakpam Iboyaima	1,559	8.18%	
INC	Sorokhaibam Ibomcha Singh	1,135	5.95%	−18.01%
RJD	Amom Nagin Singh	953	5.00%	
CPI	Laishram Ibochouba Singh	586	3.07%	
NCP	Laishram Subhas	368	1.93%	
Margin of victory		461	2.42%	1.01%
Turnout		19,060	92.22%	0.09%
Registered electors		20,871		9.64%
BJP gain from JD		Swing	1.93%	

=== Assembly Election 1995 ===
1995 Manipur Legislative Assembly election: Sugnu
Party	Candidate	Votes	%	±%
JD	Mayanglambam Babu Singh	4,404	25.37%	
INC	Loitongbam Ibomcha Singh	4,159	23.96%	−6.85%
BJP	Achou Singh Sorokhaibam	3,264	18.81%	
MPP	Khumukcham Raghumani Singh	3,180	18.32%	
IC(S)	Khaidem Nimai Singh	2,349	13.53%	
Margin of victory		245	1.41%	−11.21%
Turnout		17,356	92.13%	3.33%
Registered electors		19,036		−6.19%
JD hold		Swing	-18.06%	

=== Assembly Election 1990 ===
1990 Manipur Legislative Assembly election: Sugnu
Party	Candidate	Votes	%	±%
JD	Loitongbam Ibomcha Singh	7,708	43.44%	
INC	Mayanglambam Babu Singh	5,468	30.81%	1.51%
CPI	Khumukcham Sanayaima	3,502	19.74%	−0.84%
INS(SCS)	Achou	1,012	5.70%	
Margin of victory		2,240	12.62%	5.07%
Turnout		17,745	88.80%	−3.20%
Registered electors		20,292		28.27%
JD gain from INC		Swing	14.14%	

=== Assembly Election 1984 ===
1984 Manipur Legislative Assembly election: Sugnu
Party	Candidate	Votes	%	±%
INC	Mayanglambam Babu Singh	4,178	29.30%	
Independent	Loitongbam Ibomcha Singh	3,101	21.75%	
CPI	Mayanglambam Nila Singh	2,934	20.58%	−10.50%
IC(S)	Khaidem Nimaichand	2,904	20.37%	
Independent	Achou Singh Sorokhaibam	1,142	8.01%	
Margin of victory		1,077	7.55%	0.16%
Turnout		14,259	92.00%	5.45%
Registered electors		15,820		8.41%
INC gain from CPI		Swing	-1.77%	

=== Assembly Election 1980 ===
1980 Manipur Legislative Assembly election: Sugnu
Party	Candidate	Votes	%	±%
CPI	Mayanglambam Nila Singh	3,836	31.07%	−4.02%
INC(U)	Mayanglambam Babu Singh	2,923	23.68%	
INC(I)	Achou Singh Sorokhaibam	2,413	19.55%	
JP	Khaidem Nimaichand	2,401	19.45%	
MPP	Takhelambam Tatu	772	6.25%	−35.59%
Margin of victory		913	7.40%	0.64%
Turnout		12,345	86.56%	2.00%
Registered electors		14,593		23.63%
CPI gain from MPP		Swing	-10.77%	

=== Assembly Election 1974 ===
1974 Manipur Legislative Assembly election: Sugnu
Party	Candidate	Votes	%	±%
MPP	Khaidem Nimaichand	4,090	41.84%	15.88%
CPI	Mayanglambam Nila Singh	3,430	35.09%	−2.51%
INC(O)	Takhelambam Tatu	1,401	14.33%	
Socialist Party (India)	Khumukcham Tomba Singh	772	7.90%	
Independent	Thinginam Anoubi	59	0.60%	
Margin of victory		660	6.75%	5.58%
Turnout		9,775	84.56%	1.66%
Registered electors		11,804		2.53%
MPP gain from CPI		Swing	4.24%	

=== Assembly Election 1972 ===
1972 Manipur Legislative Assembly election: Sugnu
Party	Candidate	Votes	%	±%
CPI	Mayanglambam Nila Singh	3,512	37.60%	
INC	Mayanglambam Kamal	3,403	36.43%	
MPP	Khaidem Nimaichand	2,425	25.96%	
Margin of victory		109	1.17%	
Turnout		9,340	82.90%	
Registered electors		11,513		
CPI win (new seat)				

== See also ==
- List of constituencies of the Manipur Legislative Assembly
- Thoubal district
