= Laishram Nandakumar Singh =

Indian politician

Laishram Nandakumar Singh was an Indian politician from Manipur. From 2002 to 2017, he was elected to the Legislative Assembly of Manipur, as the Indian National Congress candidate in the Uripok constituency. In the 1995 and 2000 elections he contested the same seat, as a member of Federal Party of Manipur. He finished second both times.

In 2002 he was appointed Cabinet Minister of Urban Development, law and legislative, education, health, labour, in the Manipur state government. Prior to entering politics, he was the Vice Charmain of the All India Bar Council and Senior Advocate of the Guwahati High Court.
