= Manipur Progressive Secular Alliance =

Indian political Alliance in Manipur

- MPSA; Manipur Progressive Secular Alliance
- Abbreviation: MPSA
- Chairman: Kshetrimayum Santa (CPIM)
- Founded: 17 June 2020
- Headquarters: Manipur
- Alliance: INDIA
- Seats in Rajya Sabha: 0 / 1
- Seats in Lok Sabha: 2 / 2
- Seats in Manipur Legislative Assembly: 5 / 60

The Manipur Progressive Secular Alliance (MPSA) (formarly known as Secular Progressive Front (SPF) or Secular Progressive Alliance (SPA)) is a political alliance in India. The alliance includes six parties on a basis of an 18-point common agenda.

== Formation ==
=== Secular Progressive Front ===
The Leader of the Opposition and ex-Chief Minister of Manipur Okram Ibobi Singh formed the Secular Progressive Front. The Congress President Sonia Gandhi accepted its formation. The SPF was founded after the resignation of three Members of the Legislative Assembly (MLA) from the Bharatiya Janata Party, four from the National People's Party, one from the All India Trinamool Congress, and the withdrawal of one Independent from the National Democratic Alliance in Manipur on 17 June 2020.

On 18 June 2020, Singh said that the Indian National Congress had formed a coalition of like-minded parties in Manipur and called a special Assembly session to prove a majority. The Secular Progressive Front met with Manipur's Governor Najma Heptulla to attempt to form a government in Manipur. The SPF also sought the removal of the Speaker of the Manipur Assembly, Yumnam Khemchand Singh. However later the alliance didn't work & the SPF failed to form government in 2020.

=== MSPA formation ===
Later before the 2022 Manipur Legislative Assembly election the Congress rebranded the SPA alliance with new partners. The Congress allied with CPI, CPI(M), Forward Bloc, Revolutionary Socialist Party & the Janata Dal (Secular). On 5 February 2022 Congress manipur incharge Jairam ramesh announced that the new alliance will be called as Manipur Progressive Secular Alliance or simply the MPSA . The alliance won just 5 out of 60 seats and the Congress lost 23 seats.

== Current members ==
No.	Party	Symbol	MLAs in current Assembly
1	Indian National Congress		5
2	Communist Party of India		0
3	Communist Party of India (Marxist)		0
4	All India Forward Bloc		0
5	Revolutionary Socialist Party		0
Total			5

== Indian General Election results (In Manipur) ==
Year	Seats won/ Seats contested	Change in Seats	Voteshare (%)	+/- (%)	Popular vote
2024	2 / 2	▲2	47.59%	▲22.88%	7,52,491

== State Legislative Assembly election ==
Year	Seats won/ Seats contested	Change in Seats	Voteshare (%)	+/- (%)	Popular vote
2022	5 / 60	▼23	16.89%	▼19.25%	312,659

== Members in Manipur assembly ==
The Front has the 5 members in the Manipur Legislative Assembly.

Constituency	Name of Member	Party
Khundrakpam	Thokchom Lokeshwar Singh	Indian National Congress
Thoubal	Okram Ibobi Singh	Indian National Congress
Wangkhem	Keisham Meghachandra Singh	Indian National Congress
Khangabok	Surjakumar Okram	Indian National Congress
Sugnu	Kangujam Ranjit Singh	Indian National Congress

== See also ==
- Secular Progressive Front (2002–2012)
- Left and Secular Alliance
- Left and Secular Democratic Front
