= International Democratic Party =

Indian political party

The Internationalist Democratic Party is a small political party in the Republic of India, working in Jammu & Kashmir, Punjab and Rajasthan. The IDP was founded by R.P. Saraf, a former Communist Party (Marxist–Leninist) leader, in 1986.

The national president of the IDP was Master Kheta Singh and general Secretary Hoshiar Singh from Samba district (J&K). Hoshiar Singh and his wife Smt. Sashi Bala were gunned down by unknown militants at 11 May 2008 in their Samba residence.

The IDP favours politics of peace. The party favours joint Indo-Pakistani control over Kashmir as a means to achieve peace. It has protested against increasing corruption in Jammu and Kashmir. The party also favours increased autonomy for the Jammu and Ladakh regions.

The present president of IDP is I.D. Khajuria and general secretary is S. Karnail Singh Jakhepal.
