= Chungkhokai Doungel =

Indian politician (died 2023)

Chungkhokai Doungel (1940/1941 – 21 May 2023) was an Indian politician. Doungel was a prominent Kuki leader, and served as Minister in different coalition governments in the state of Manipur.

Doungel and his sons survived several assassination attempts. He limped after suffered an injury to his leg in one such attempt. His wife was blinded by a bomb sent to her on 7 July 1995.

Doungel was fielded by the National Congress Party as its candidate from the Outer Manipur seat in the 2014 Indian general election. His candidature was supported by seven parties from the Left and Secular Alliance; the Communist Party of India, the Communist Party of India (Marxist), the Revolutionary Socialist Party, the All India Forward Bloc, the Janata Dal (Secular), the Shiv Sena and the Bahujan Samaj Party. The NCP organized the launching ceremony of Doungel's election campaign at his private residence Sanjenthong. Amongst the other political parties that took part in the ceremony were the CPI and CPI(M).

Doungel died on 21 May 2023, at the age of 82.
