= Left and Secular Alliance =

- Founded: 2014
- Ideology: Big tent Factions: Communism; Marxism-Leninism; Socialism; Bahujanism; Liberalism; Secularism; Integral humanism Gandhism; Left-wing nationalism Anti-imperialism
- Political position: Syncretic; Internal positions: Far-left to centre

The Left and Secular Alliance was a pre-poll alliance of political parties in the Indian state of Manipur. The alliance was formed ahead of the 2014 Indian general election by ten political parties as an alternative to the Bharatiya Janata Party (BJP) and the Indian National Congress (INC).

== Background ==
The alliance supported the candidature of Moirangthem Nara Singh of CPI in the Inner Manipur seat. Following voting in the 2014 election, the alliance consisted of the Communist Party of India (CPI), the Communist Party of India (Marxist) (CPI(M)), the Revolutionary Socialist Party (RSP), the All India Forward Bloc (AIFB), the Janata Dal (Secular) (JD(S)), the Shiv Sena (SS), the People's Democratic Alliance (PDA) and the Bahujan Samaj Party (BSP). Shantakumar Khetrimayum of CPI(M) is the convenor of the alliance.

In the Outer Manipur seat the Janata Dal (United) (JD(U)), which formed part of the alliance, had wished to get support for its candidate Lien Gangte. However, seven of the constituents of the alliance decided to support the Nationalist Congress Party (NCP) nominee Chungkhokai Doungel. This decision was however done individually by each party, not by the alliance as such. Likewise the NCP declared that it would support the candidature of Nara Singh in Inner Manipur. Moving away from the Left and Secular Alliance, JD(U) declared support to the All India Trinamool Congress candidate Sarangthem Manaobi in Inner Manipur.

Following the vote in Inner Manipur the alliance complained of large-scale rigging in favour of the Congress candidate. Nara Singh, speaking on behalf of the alliance, questioned that polling figures as high as 90% had been reported from 112 voting stations. The alliancer sent a delegation to Delhi to lodge their complaint. The BJP took part in the delegation.

== Constituent parties ==
- Communist Party of India (CPI)
- Communist Party of India (Marxist) (CPI(M))
- Revolutionary Socialist Party (India) (RSP)
- All India Forward Bloc (AIFB)
- People's Democratic Alliance (PDA)
- Nationalist Congress Party (NCP)
- Janata Dal (Secular) (JD(S))
- Janata Dal (United) (JD(U))
- Bahujan Samaj Party (BSP)

== See also ==
- Left and Democratic Front
- Manipur Progressive Secular Alliance
