= List of state presidents of the Indian National Congress =

Current state presidents in INC

The state president of the Indian National Congress is the state-level highest command of the Indian National Congress (INC), responsible for leading in political campaigns at state level. State presidents shoulder a diverse array of roles and responsibilities integral to the effective functioning of the party at the state-level. Also known as the leader of the state and union territory party, a state president is appointed by the national president of the party.

Being the higher decision-making body, state presidents actively contribute to the formulation of state-level policies, representing the party's stance on relevant issues and engaging in the development and implementation of election strategies during state elections. In addition, a state president is tasked with overseeing the organizational structure of the Pradesh Congress Committee, including the appointment and coordination of leaders at various levels, such as the district committee, block committee, and each panchayat development block or panchayat samiti. Serving as a spokesperson for the party in the state, they communicate the party's positions to the media and keep party members informed about policies and decisions. State presidents also play a pivotal role in building and maintaining the party's membership, reaching out to diverse sections of society and addressing their concerns to advance the party's agenda.

Conflict resolution within the party, fundraising activities, and the establishment of political alliances with other parties at the state level are also within the purview of the state president. They act as representatives of the Pradesh Congress Committee in interactions with the central leadership of the Indian National Congress, providing feedback and information about the state's political landscape and challenges. As of 2023, the INC has appointed states and union territories presidents for all states and union territories in India.

== State-wise party presidents ==
State presidents
State	State committee	Portrait	Name	Took office	Appointed by	Ref.
Andhra Pradesh	Andhra PCC		Y. S. Sharmila	16 January 2024 (2 years, 296 days)	Mallikarjun Kharge	
Arunachal Pradesh	Arunachal PCC		Bosiram Siram	18 June 2025 (1 year, 143 days)	Mallikarjun Kharge	
Assam	Assam PCC		Gaurav Gogoi	26 May 2025 (1 year, 166 days)	Mallikarjun Kharge	
Bihar	Bihar PCC		Rajesh Kumar	18 March 2025 (1 year, 235 days)	Mallikarjun Kharge	
Chhattisgarh	Chhattisgarh PCC		Deepak Baij	12 July 2023 (3 years, 119 days)	Mallikarjun Kharge	
Goa	Goa PCC		Girish Chodankar	29 May 2026 (163 days)	Mallikarjun Kharge	
Gujarat	Gujarat PCC		Amit Chavda	17 July 2025 (3 years, 152 days)	Mallikarjun Kharge	
Haryana	Haryana PCC		Rao Narendra Singh	29 September 2025 (1 year, 40 days)	Mallikarjun Kharge	
Himachal Pradesh	Himachal PCC		Vinay Kumar	22 November 2025 (351 days)	Mallikarjun Kharge	
Jharkhand	Jharkhand PCC		Keshav Mahto Kamlesh	16 August 2024 (2 years, 84 days)	Mallikarjun Kharge	
Karnataka	Karnataka PCC		B. K. Hariprasad	6 June 2026 (155 days)	Mallikarjun Kharge	
Kerala	Kerala PCC		Sunny Joseph	8 May 2025 (1 year, 184 days)	Mallikarjun Kharge	
Madhya Pradesh	Madhya Pradesh CC		Jitu Patwari	20 December 2023 (2 years, 323 days)	Mallikarjun Kharge	
Maharashtra	Maharashtra PCC		Harshwardhan Vasantrao Sapkal	13 February 2025 (1 year, 268 days)	Mallikarjun Kharge	
Manipur	Manipur PCC		Okram Ibobi Singh	5 February 2026 (276 days)	Mallikarjun Kharge	
Meghalaya	Meghalaya PCC		Vincent Pala	25 August 2021 (5 years, 75 days)	Sonia Gandhi	
Mizoram	Mizoram PCC		Lal Thanzara	21 February 2024 (2 years, 260 days)	Mallikarjun Kharge	
Nagaland	Nagaland PCC		S. Supongmeren Jamir	3 September 2023 (3 years, 222 days)	Mallikarjun Kharge	
Odisha	Odisha PCC		Bhakta Charan Das	11 February 2025 (1 year, 270 days)	Mallikarjun Kharge	
Punjab	Punjab PCC		Pargat Singh	2 October 2026 (37 days)	Mallikarjun Kharge	
Rajasthan	Rajasthan PCC		Govind Singh Dotasra	14 July 2020 (6 years, 117 days)	Sonia Gandhi	
Sikkim	Sikkim PCC		Gopal Chettri	22 September 2023 (3 years, 47 days)	Mallikarjun Kharge	
Tamil Nadu	Tamil Nadu CC		Manickam Tagore	29 June 2026 (132 days)	Mallikarjun Kharge	
Telangana	Telangana PCC		Bomma Mahesh Kumar Goud	6 September 2024 (2 years, 63 days)	Mallikarjun Kharge	
Tripura	Tripura PCC		Ashish Kumar Saha	18 June 2023 (3 years, 143 days)	Mallikarjun Kharge	
Uttar Pradesh	Uttar Pradesh CC		Aradhana Misra	2 October 2026 (37 days)	Mallikarjun Kharge	
Uttarakhand	Uttarakhand PCC		Ganesh Godiyal	11 November 2025 (362 days)	Mallikarjun Kharge	
West Bengal	West Bengal PCC		Subhankar Sarkar	21 September 2024 (2 years, 48 days)	Mallikarjun Kharge	

== Union territory-wise party presidents ==
Union Territories Presidents
Union territory	Territorial committee	Name	Portrait	Took office	Appointed by	Ref.
Andaman and Nicobar Islands	Andaman and Nicobar TCC		Ranglal Halder	6 August 2021 (5 years, 94 days)	Sonia Gandhi	
Chandigarh	Chandigarh TCC		Harmohinder Singh	12 June 2022 (4 years, 149 days)	Sonia Gandhi	
Dadra and Nagar Haveli and Daman and Diu	Dadra and Nagar Haveli and Daman and Diu TCC		Prabhu Tokiya	N/A (Note: The appointment date is not available at this time.)	Mallikarjun Kharge	
Delhi	Delhi PCC		Devender Yadav	1 May 2024 (2 years, 191 days)	Mallikarjun Kharge	
Jammu and Kashmir	Jammu and Kashmir PCC		Tariq Hameed Karra	16 August 2024 (2 years, 84 days)	Mallikarjun Kharge	
Ladakh	Ladakh TCC		Nawang Rigzin Jora	31 January 2021 (5 years, 281 days)	Sonia Gandhi	
Lakshadweep	Lakshadweep TCC		Muhammed Hamdulla Sayeed	N/A	Sonia Gandhi	
Puducherry	Puducherry PCC		V. Vaithilingam	9 June 2023 (3 years, 152 days)	Mallikarjun Kharge	

== Region-wise party president ==
Regional Presidents
Region	Regional committee	Name	Portrait	Took office	Appointed by	Ref.
Mumbai	Mumbai RCC		Varsha Gaikwad	9 June 2023 (3 years, 152 days)	Mallikarjun Kharge	

== See also ==
- List of presidents of the Indian National Congress
- List of chief ministers from the Indian National Congress
- List of state presidents of the Bharatiya Janata Party
