= All India Congress Committee =

Central decision-making assembly of the Indian National Congress (INC)

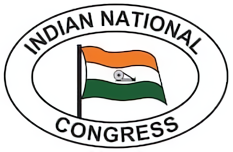

Type
- Type: Presidium of the Indian National Congress of India

Leadership
- National President: Mallikarjun Kharge
- Parliamentary Chairperson: Sonia Gandhi

Structure
- Political groups: Indian National Congress
- Committees: Parliamentary Board
- Committees: Congress Working Committee

Website
- inc.in/aicc-office-bearers

The All India Congress Committee (AICC) is the presidium or the central decision-making assembly of the Indian National Congress. It is composed of members elected from state-level Pradesh Congress Committees and can have as many as a thousand members. It is the AICC that elects members of the Congress Working Committee and the Congress President, who is also the head of the AICC.

The organisational executives of the AICC are several general-secretaries selected by the Congress President and the members of the Congress Working Committee. AICC is responsible for decision-making and policy formulation for the party at the national level. It also sets the party's agenda and strategies for national and state-level elections.

== History ==
The original headquarters of AICC were located at Swaraj Bhavan, (Note: The building was previously known as Anand Bhavan. When the AICC made a base here, the Nehru family built another house close by and called it Anand Bhavan and the old house became Swaraj Bhavan) Allahabad, however after independence of India in 1947, it was shifted to 7, Jantar Mantar Marg, near Jantar Mantar, Delhi and subsequently to 24 Akbar Road, right behind 10 Janpath, after the 1969 Congress split, under Indira Gandhi.

=== Pre independence ===
Although the Congress was founded in 1885, it initially operated through annual meetings without a permanent central administrative structure. The AICC emerged in its institutional form following the reorganisation of the Congress at the Nagpur Session 1920, when a new constitution was adopted to transform the party into a mass-based organisation. This restructuring introduced a system of elected representatives from Provincial Congress Committees, thereby establishing the AICC as a representative central body.

In the pre-independence period, the AICC served primarily as the coordinating link between the Congress leadership and its provincial units. It was responsible for framing and approving organisational resolutions, maintaining communication across regions, and ensuring the implementation of decisions taken by the party leadership. The early headquarters of the AICC were located at Swaraj Bhavan in Allahabad, which functioned as an important administrative centre for Congress activities.

=== Post independence ===
Following the Independence of India, the role of the AICC underwent a significant transformation as the Congress transitioned from a national movement to a governing political party. The organisation assumed greater responsibility in managing party affairs across the country, coordinating with state units, and supporting the functioning of the party within the framework of parliamentary democracy.

Today, its institutional records are part of the Archives at the Nehru Memorial Museum & Library, at Teen Murti House, Delhi.

== Organisation ==
The organisation is headed by the Congress President, who is elected by the All India Congress Committee. The AICC on the other hand is composed of delegates sent by the various State–level Pradesh Congress Committees, who themselves have been elected or nominated to their respective Pradesh Congress Committee from the district and panchayat level party units. Besides the President, these delegates also elect the Congress Working Committee, which is the apex decision-making body of the organisation. Several General Secretaries are also appointed by the President to run the organisation.

== AICC office bearers ==
=== President ===
Sl No	Name	Portrait	Origin State	Position in Government
1.	Mallikarjun Kharge		Karnataka	Leader of the Opposition in Rajya Sabha

=== Treasurer ===
Sl. No	Name	Portrait	Origin State	Position in Government
1.	Ajay Maken		Delhi	Member of Parliament, Rajya Sabha

=== Joint Treasurers ===
Sl. No	Name	Portrait	Home State	Position in Government
1.	Vijay Inder Singla		Punjab	Former MP, Lok Sabha; Former Minister Punjab Government

=== General secretaries ===
Sl No	Name	Portrait	Home State	Position in Party
1.	K.C. Venugopal		Kerala	MP, Lok Sabha (I/C) Organisation
2.	Priyanka Gandhi		Delhi	MP, Lok Sabha; Without any assigned portfolio
3.	Mukul Wasnik		Maharashtra	MP Rajya Sabha; Without any assigned portfolio
4.	Sachin Pilot		Rajasthan	MLA Rajasthan, (I/C) Punjab
5.	Randeep Surjewala		Haryana	MP Rajya Sabha, (I/C) Gujarat; Karnataka (Additional Charge)
6.	Kumari Selja		Haryana	MP, Lok Sabha, (I/C) Uttarakhand
7.	Jairam Ramesh		Karnataka	MP Rajya Sabha,(I/C)Communications, Publicity, Media Including Social & Digital Media
8.	Deepa Dasmunshi		West Bengal	ex-MP, (I/C) Kerala, Lakshadweep
9.	Bhupesh Baghel		Chhattisgarh	MLA, (I/C) Assam
10.	Ghulam Ahmad Mir		Jammu and Kashmir	MLA, (I/C) Tamil Nadu, Puducherry
11.	Syed Naseer Hussain		Karnataka	MP Rajya Sabha,(I/C)Jammu and Kashmir; Ladakh

=== In-Charges ===
S.No	Member	Picture	Allotted Work/Area
1.	Gurdeep Singh Sappal		Administration
2.	Rajani Patil (MP)		Himachal Pradesh, Chandigarh
3.	Manikrao Thakare (Ex MLA)		Goa, Daman and Diu, Dadra and Nagar Haveli
4.	Sirivella Prasad		Maharashtra
5.	Prakash Joshi		West Bengal
6.	Sukhjinder Singh Randhawa (MP)		Rajasthan
7.	Sanjay Datt		Haryana
8.	P. V. Mohan		Andhra Pradesh, Andaman and Nicobar Islands
9.	A. Chellakumar (MP)		Meghalaya, Mizoram, Arunachal Pradesh
10.	Krishna Allavaru		Bihar
11.	Harish Chaudhary (MLA)		Madhya Pradesh
12.	Saptagiri Sankar Ulaka (MP)		Sikkim, Tripura, Manipur, Nagaland
13.	Lalji Desai		Odisha
14.	K. Raju		Jharkhand
15.	B. M. Sandeep		Telangana
16.	Rajendra Pal Gautam		Uttar Pradesh
17.	Sukhdeo Bhagat		Chhattisgarh
18.	Sachin Rao		Training, Sandesh
19.	Manish Sharma		Indian Youth Congress
20.	Kanhaiya Kumar		National Students' Union of India
21.	Manish Chatrath		Party Headquarters

=== Secretaries with assigned work ===
S.No	State/UT/Responsibility	Secretary
1.	Office of Hon'ble Congress President	Pranav Jha; Gaurav Pandhi
2.	Communication, Publicity, Media incl. Social & Digital Media	Vineet Punia; Ruchira Chaturvedi
3.	Assam	Manoj Chauhan; Boby Bhagat; Iftekar Ahmed
4.	Kerala; Lakshadweep	Mayura S. Jayakumar; Ganesh Kumar Yadav
5.	Tamil Nadu; Puducherry	Nivedith Alva; Janga Goutham; Venkateswar
6.	Uttarakhand	Manoj Yadav; Surender Sharma; Bhim Kumar
7.	Gujarat	Ramkishan Ojha; Subhashini Yadav; Hem Singh Shekhawat; Naresh Thakur
8.	Karnataka	Netta D'Souza; Mohan Joshi; Syed Azmathullah Hussaini; S. Sarath
9.	Punjab	Hina Kaware; Ravindra Dalvi; Suraj Singh Thakur; Raj Kumar Maurya
10.	Jammu & Kashmir; Ladakh	Deeraj Gurjar; Sushil Kumar Pasi
11.	Meghalaya; Mizoram; Arunachal Pradesh	Anil A. Thomas; Susanta Chakraborty; Jenab Chandel
12.	Madhya Pradesh	Neetu Verma Soin; Pal Bhai Ambaliya; Ajay Kumar Paswan; Omveer Yadav
13.	Jharkhand	Bhupendra Maravi; Avnish Kajla
14.	Bihar	Pradeep Narwal; Prakash Sonawane; Mahaboob Pasha
15.	Odisha	Jetti Kusum Kumar; Purnachandra Padhi
16.	Goa; Dadra & Nagar Haveli and Daman & Diu	Anjali Nimbalkar
17.	Telangana	Sachin Sawant; Simon Alex
18.	Delhi	Danish Abrar
19.	Andhra Pradesh; Andaman and Nicobar Islands	Senthamil Arasu; V. Shankar
20.	West Bengal	Abdul Khaleeq; Deebashish Patnaik; Gunjan Patel
21.	Himachal Pradesh; Chandigarh	Kamal Kant Sharma; Rahul Rajbhar
22.	Uttar Pradesh	Abhishek Dutt; Varun Choudhary; Kunal Choudhary; Jagdish Chander Jangid; Abdul Hannan; Sanjeev Arya
23.	Haryana	Deepak Rathore; Sunil Ahire
24.	Manipur; Tripura; Sikkim; Nagaland	Szarita Laitphlang; Amit Bawa Saini; Dungar Ram Gedar
25.	Maharashtra	U.B. Venkatesh; Rehana Rayaz Chisti; F.H. Jakkappanavar; Yogender Yogi
26.	Chhattisgarh	Jitendra Baghel; Harnam Singh
27.	Rajasthan	Vishwa Vijay Singh; Porlak Kharte; Palak Verma; Manoj Bagri
28.	Joint Treasurer – Assets & Properties	Nilesh Patel; Nitin Kumbalkar
29.	Administration	Sushant Mishra; Manoj Tyagi
30.	Training, Sandesh	Santosh Kolkunda
31.	Indian Overseas Congress & Foreign Affairs	Arathi Krishna

=== Joint Secretaries ===
S.No	Member	Party Position
1.	Dr. Palak Verma	Andhra Pradesh; Andaman and Nicobar
2.	Mathew Antony	Arunachal Pradesh; Meghalaya; Mizoram
3.	Vijay Jangid	Chhattisgarh
4.	Rannvijay Singh Lochav	Madhya Pradesh
5.	Sushant Mishra; Manoj Tyagi	Administration
6.	Nitin Kumbalkar; Nilesh Patel	Treasurer

== Departments and Cells ==
S.No	Name	Portrait	Department Head
1.	All India Professionals Congress		Madhu Yaskhi Goud
2.	All India Adivasi Congress		Vikrant Bhuria
3.	All India Fisherman Congress		S. Armstrong Fernando
4.	All India Kisan Congress		Sukhpal Singh Khaira
5.	Unorganised Workers and Employees other than Professionals		Udit Raj; EX MP Loksabha
6.	Data Analytics Department		Praveen Chakravarty
7.	Communication Department		Jairam Ramesh
8.	Ex Servicemen Department		Col. Rohit Chaudhary
9.	Foreign Affairs Department		Salman Khurshid
10.	Grievance Cell		Archana Dalmia
11.	Hindi Department		Anil Shastri
12.	Minorities Department		Imran Pratapgarhi
13.	OBC Department		Dr. Anil Jaihind Yadav
14.	Indian Overseas Congress Department		Sam Pitroda
15.	Rajiv Gandhi Panchayati Raj Sangathan		Sunil Panwar
16.	Research Department		Rajeev Gowda
17.	SC Department		Rajendra Pal Gautam
18.	Social Media & Digital Platforms		Supriya Shrinate
19.	AICC Law, Human Rights, & RTI Department		Abhishek Singhvi
20.	Training Department		Sachin Rao
21.	Vichar Vibhag		Vacant
22.	Jawahar Bal Manch		Dr. G V Hari
23.	Assets and Properties		Vijay Inder Singla
24.	Civic and Social Outreach Congress		Sandeep Dikshit; Ex–MP Loksabha

== Communication Department ==
Sl. No	Name	Portrait	Position in Government and Party
1.	Jairam Ramesh		MP, Incharge
2.	Pranav Jha		Secretary Incharge
3.	Vineet Punia		Secretary Incharge, Internal Communications
4.	Abhishek Dutt		Media Panelist

== Rajiv Gandhi Panchayati Raj Sangathan ==
Sl. No	Name	Position in Government and Party
1.	Sunil Panwar	Chairman
2.	Kunal Banerjee	Vice Chairman
3.	Deepak Rathore	General Secretary
4.	Nanda Rajendra Mahtre	General Secretary
5.	Narayan Singh Rathore	General Secretary
6.	Sitaram Lamba	General Secretary
7.	Kiran Mugabasav	General Secretary
8.	Akshay S. Samarth	General Secretary
9.	Jayanti Bhatiya	General Secretary
10.	Inamul Hasan	General Secretary
11.	Km. Reena Gawskar Valmiki	General Secretary
12.	Amit Gupta	Secretary
13.	Shyam Lal Purohit	Secretary
14.	Tripta Kumari	Secretary
15.	Javed Iqbal Lone	Secretary
16.	Mohan Dagar	Secretary
17.	Ram Singh Negi	Secretary
18.	Vivek Awasthi	Secretary
19.	B. Subhash Yakkara	Secretary
20.	Abhishek Kumar Tripathi	Secretary
21.	K. Ramesh	Secretary
22.	Videshwari Singh Rathor	Secretary
23.	Sanjay Kumar Taraori	Secretary
24.	Arjun Radhakrishanan	Secretary
25.	Meer Akhtar Hussain	Secretary
26.	Km. Niklesh Saroj	Secretary
27.	Gopa Dhapola	Secretary
28.	Rajesh Sheokand	National Coordinator
29.	Aenkannagari Mahendhar Reddy	National Coordinator
30.	J. Kalimuthu	National Coordinator
31.	Mohd. Chand	National Coordinator
32.	Pratap Kumar Pradhan	National Coordinator
33.	Rajesh Kashipaka	National Coordinator
34.	Sushma Verma	National Coordinator
35.	S. Vijaya Krishna	National Coordinator
36.	Dashrath Singh Meena	National Coordinator
37.	Urmila Dhayal	National Coordinator
38.	Sujit Sarkhel	National Coordinator
39.	Amit Kumar Jha	National Coordinator
40.	Ashika Kujur	National Coordinator
41.	Rajinder Kaur	National Coordinator
42.	Km. Renuka Gandhi	National Coordinator
43.	Seema Bagri	National Coordinator
44.	Braj Bhushan Pande	Training Team
45.	Jitendra Kasana	Training Team
46.	Dinesh Sharma	Training Team
47.	Narinder Singh Sandhu	Training Team
48.	Vijender Narwal	Training Team
49.	Radhey Shyam Gomla	Training Team
50.	B. Susheel Kumar	Training Team
51.	Cynthia Stephen	Training Team
52.	Vikas Budania	Training Team
53.	Prashant Patha	Training Team
54.	Former National Chairperson of RGPRS	Advisory Member
55.	Sachin Naik	Advisory Member
56.	Hemant Tale	Advisory Member

== Senior Spokespersons ==
S.No	Member	Party Position
1.	P. Chidambaram	MP
2.	Anand Sharma	Ex MP
3.	Salman Khurshid	Ex MP
4.	Mukul Wasnik	MP
5.	Ajay Maken	MP
6.	Manish Tewari	MP

== Spokespersons ==
S.No	Member	Party/Government Position
1	Abhishek Singhvi	Rajya Sabha MP from Telangana
2	Akhilesh Pratap Singh	Former MLA from Rudrapur, Uttar Pradesh
3	Bhakta Charan Das	Former Lok Sabha MP, President Odisha PCC
4	Deepender Singh Hooda	Lok Sabha MP from Rohtak
5	Dinesh Gundu Rao	MLA, Former Cabinet Minister, Government of Karnataka
6	Gaurav Gogoi	MP, Deputy LoP in Lok Sabha, President Assam PCC
7	Hina Kaware	ex-MLA
8	Rajeev Gowda	ex-MP
9	Madhu Goud Yaskhi	ex-MP
10	Meem Afzal	ex-MP
11	Dr. Shama Mohammed	
12	PL Punia	ex MP
13	Kuldeep Kumar	
14	Mohan Prakash	
15	Rajni Patil	MP
16	Shaktisinh Gohil	MP
17	Syed Naseer Hussain	MP
18	Sandeep Dikshit	ex-MP
19	Vijay Inder Singla	ex Cabinet Minister, Government of Punjab
20	Anshul Avijit	
21	Kuldeep Singh Rathore	MLA Himachal Pradesh
22	Pawan Khera	MP, Rajya Sabha
23	Udit Raj	ex-MP
24	Shobha Oza	
25	Ragini Nayak	
26	Supriya Shrinate	Former executive editor with The Times Group.
27	Sunil Ahire	
28	Priyanka Gupta	Social Activist; Spokesperson Consultant and Trainer UPCC.
29	Dr. Shivanand Hulyalkar	Karnataka and Goa State In charge Ex-Textile Minister - Government Of India.

== Congress in Pradesh (States) ==
- Andaman and Nicobar PCC
- Andhra Pradesh PCC
- Arunachal Pradesh PCC
- Assam PCC
- Bihar PCC
- Chhattisgarh PCC
- Dadra and Nagar Haveli and Daman and Diu PCC
- Delhi PCC
- Goa PCC
- Gujarat PCC
- Haryana PCC
- Himachal Pradesh PCC
- Jammu & Kashmir PCC
- Jharkhand PCC
- Karnataka PCC
- Kerala PCC
- Lakshadweep PCC
- Madhya Pradesh PCC
- Maharashtra PCC
- Manipur PCC
- Meghalaya PCC
- Mizoram PCC
- Nagaland PCC
- Odisha PCC
- Puducherry PCC
- Punjab PCC
- Rajasthan PCC
- Sikkim PCC
- Tamil Nadu CC
- Telangana PCC
- Tripura PCC
- Uttarakhand PCC
- Uttar Pradesh PCC
- West Bengal PCC

== See also ==
- Indian National Congress
- Congress Working Committee
- Pradesh Congress Committee
- North East Congress Coordination Committee
