= Pradesh Congress Committee =

State wings of the Indian National Congress

A Pradesh Congress Committee (PCC) is the state-level unit of the Indian National Congress. It is responsible for the organization and management of the party's activities in a particular state of India. The PCC is made up of a president and several other office-bearers who are responsible for overseeing the party's activities in the state.

The PCC is responsible for coordinating the activities of the Congress party at the district and block levels, and for organizing campaigns and events to mobilize public support for the party. It also works to build alliances with other political parties and social groups to enhance the party's electoral prospects.

It is elected by card-holding members of the Congress and in turn elects state president and delegates to the All India Congress Committee. Each PCC has a working committee of twenty members, most of whom are appointed by the party president, the leader of the state party, who is chosen by the national president. Those elected as members of the states' legislative assemblies form the Congress Legislature Parties in the various state assemblies.

== List of Pradesh Congress Committees ==
This is a list of the official state, territorial and regional committees of the Indian National Congress.

State/UT	Committee	Seats in Lok Sabha	Seats in Rajya Sabha	Seats in State Legislative Assemblies	Seats in State Legislative Councils	References
India	AICC	99 / 543 (2 Vacant)	Elected 31 / 233 (1 Vacant) Nominated 0 / 12	662 / 4,126	56 / 426	
State Committees of the Indian National Congress
Andhra Pradesh	Andhra PCC	0 / 25	0 / 11	0 / 175	Elected 0 / 50 Nominated 0 / 8	
Arunachal Pradesh	Arunachal PCC	0 / 2	0 / 1	1 / 60		
Assam	Assam PCC	2 / 14	0 / 7	19 / 126		
Bihar	Bihar PCC	4 / 40	1 / 16	6 / 243	Elected 1 / 63 Nominated 0 / 12	
Chhattisgarh	Chhattisgarh PCC	1 / 11	3 / 5	35 / 90		
Goa	Goa PCC	1 / 2	0 / 1	3 / 40		
Gujarat	Gujarat PCC	1 / 26	0 / 11	12 / 182		
Haryana	Haryana PCC	5 / 10	1 / 5	37 / 90		
Himachal Pradesh	Himachal PCC	0 / 4	1 / 3	40 / 68		
Jharkhand	Jharkhand PCC	2 / 14	1 / 6	16 / 81		
Karnataka	Karnataka PCC	9 / 28	7 / 12	138 / 224	Elected 30 / 64 Nominated 7 / 11	
Kerala	Kerala PCC	14 / 20	1 / 9	63 / 140		
Madhya Pradesh	Madhya Pradesh CC	0 / 29	2 / 11	63 / 230		
Maharashtra	Maharashtra PCC	14 / 48	2 / 19	16 / 288	Elected 4 / 66 Nominated 0 / 12	
Manipur	Manipur PCC	2 / 2	0 / 1	5 / 60		
Meghalaya	Meghalaya PCC	1 / 2	0 / 1	0 / 60		
Mizoram	Mizoram PCC	0 / 1	0 / 1	1 / 40		
Nagaland	Nagaland PCC	1 / 1	0 / 1	0 / 60		
Odisha	Odisha PCC	1 / 21	0 / 10	11 / 147		
Punjab	Punjab PCC	7 / 13	0 / 7	16 / 117		
Rajasthan	Rajasthan PCC	8 / 25	5 / 10	67 / 200		
Sikkim	Sikkim PCC	0 / 1	0 / 1	0 / 32		
Tamil Nadu	Tamil Nadu CC	9 / 39	3 / 18	5 / 234		
Telangana	Telangana PCC	8 / 17	4 / 7	76 / 119	Elected 10 / 34 Nominated 3 / 6	
Tripura	Tripura PCC	0 / 2	0 / 1	3 / 60		
Uttar Pradesh	Uttar Pradesh CC	6 / 80	0 / 31	2 / 403	Elected 0 / 90 Nominated 0 / 10	
Uttarakhand	Uttarakhand PCC	0 / 5	0 / 3	20 / 70		
West Bengal	West Bengal PCC	1 / 42	0 / 16	2 / 294		
Territorial Committees of the Indian National Congress
Andaman and Nicobar Islands	Andaman and Nicobar TCC	0 / 1				
Chandigarh	Chandigarh TCC	1 / 1				
Dadra and Nagar Haveli and Daman and Diu	Dadra and Nagar Haveli and Daman and Diu TCC	0 / 2				
Delhi	Delhi PCC	0 / 7	0 / 3	0 / 70		
Jammu and Kashmir	Jammu and Kashmir PCC	0 / 5	0 / 4	6 / 90		
Ladakh	Ladakh TCC	0 / 1				
Lakshadweep	Lakshadweep TCC	1 / 1				
Puducherry	Puducherry PCC	1 / 1	0 / 1	Elected 1 / 30 Nominated 0 / 3		

== History ==
The organizational structure of the Indian National Congress underwent a revolutionary change in 1920 at the Nagpur Session. Under Mahatma Gandhi’s leadership, the Congress reorganized itself into 21 linguistic provinces. Prior to independence, the Pradesh Congress Committee was known as the Provincial Congress Committee.

=== Former PCC ===
Province	Committee	Disband year	Headquarters (Before disband)	Fate	References
Ajmer-Merwara (now in Rajasthan, India)	Ajmer-Merwara Provincial Congress Committee	1957	Ajmer	Merged with RPCC after statehood of Rajasthan in 1956 to align with the new state boundaries.	
Berar (now in Maharashtra, India)	Berar Provincial Congress Committee	1957	Akola	Merged with MPCC after merger of Berar province with new state of Maharashtra in 1956 to align with the new state boundaries.	
Burma (now in Myanmar)	Burma Provincial Congress Committee	1937	Rangoon	Separation of Burma from British India in 1937	
North-West Frontier (now in Pakistan)	Frontier Provincial Congress Committee	1948	Peshawar	Following the 1947 partition, the FPCC headed by Dr. Khan Sahib was dismissed by the Governor-General of Pakistan on August 22, 1947. In 1948, the Government of Pakistan officially banned its backbone organization, the Khudai Khidmatgar, and sealed the Congress offices. Most of its leadership, including Abdul Ghaffar Khan, was imprisoned, rendering the committee defunct in the newly formed state.	
Sindh (now in Pakistan)	Sindh Provincial Congress Committee	1947	Swaraj Bhawan, Karachi	Following the partition of India, Sindh went to Pakistan. The SPCC became defunct, leaders like Jairamdas Daulatram and Choithram Gidwani relocated to India, where they integrated into the All India Congress Committee (AICC).	

=== International units ===
Committee	Establishment	Disband year	Disband reasons	Ref
British Committee	1889	1920	Abolished after Nagur Session.	
Burma Committee	1937	1948	Independence of Burma.	
London Branch	1928	1929	Ideological clashes with the AICC and branch.	

== See also ==
- All India Congress Committee
- Congress Core Committee
- Congress Working Committee
- List of state presidents of the Indian National Congress
- State units of the Bharatiya Janata Party
