= Gumla Assembly constituency =

Constituency of the Jharkhand legislative assembly in India

Coordinates: 23.049°N 84.542°E

Gumla
- Constituency No. 68 for the Jharkhand Legislative Assembly

Constituency details
- Country: India
- Region: East India
- State: Jharkhand
- District: Gumla
- Lok Sabha constituency: Lohardaga
- Established: 2000
- Total electors: 221,055
- Reservation: ST

Member of Legislative Assembly
- 5th Jharkhand Legislative Assembly
- Incumbent Bhushan Tirkey
- Party: JMM
- Alliance: MGB
- Elected year: 2024

Gumla Assembly constituency is an assembly constituency in the Indian state of Jharkhand.

== Members of the Legislative Assembly ==
Election	Member	Party
Bihar Legislative Assembly
1952	Sukra Oraon	Jharkhand Party
1957	Sukra Oraon	Jharkhand Party
1962	Punai Oraon	Janata Party
1967	Ropna Oraon	Bharatiya Jana Sangh
1969	Ropna Oraon	Bharatiya Jana Sangh
1972	Bairagi Oraon	Indian National Congress
1977	Jairam Oraon	Independent politician
1980	Bairagi Oraon	Indian National Congress
1985	Bairagi Oraon	Indian National Congress
1990	Jitwahan Baraik	Bharatiya Janata Party
1995	Bernard Minz	Jharkhand Mukti Morcha
2000	Sudarshan Bhagat	Bharatiya Janata Party
Jharkhand Legislative Assembly
2005	Bhushan Tirkey	Jharkhand Mukti Morcha
2009	Kamlesh Oraon	Bharatiya Janata Party
2014	Shivshankar Oraon	Bharatiya Janata Party
2019	Bhushan Tirkey	Jharkhand Mukti Morcha
2024	Bhushan Tirkey	Jharkhand Mukti Morcha

== Election results ==
=== Assembly election 2024 ===
2024 Jharkhand Legislative Assembly election: Gumla
Party	Candidate	Votes	%	±%
JMM	Bhushan Tirkey	84,974	51.54%	▲3.59
BJP	Sudarshan Bhagat	58,673	35.59%	▼6.91
Independent	Mishir Kujur	9,873	5.99%	New
JLKM	Nisha Kumari Bhagat	1,535	0.93%	New
Independent	Sudhiram Kisan	1,455	0.88%	New
Peoples Party of India (Democratic)	Kuldeep Minz	1,000	0.61%	New
NOTA	None of the Above	3,308	2.01%	▼0.32
Margin of victory		26,301	15.95%	▲10.50
Turnout		1,64,866	66.49%	▲2.89
Registered electors		2,47,953		▲12.17
JMM hold		Swing	▲3.59	

=== Assembly election 2019 ===
2019 Jharkhand Legislative Assembly election: Gumla
Party	Candidate	Votes	%	±%
JMM	Bhushan Tirkey	67,416	47.95%	▲12.17
BJP	Mishir Kujur	59,749	42.50%	▲3.61
JVM(P)	Rajneel Tigga	2,510	1.79%	New
CPI	Bishwanath Oraon	1,501	1.07%	▼0.91
Independent	Shankar Ram Kisan	1,273	0.91%	New
Rashtriya Deshaj Party	Khudi Bhagat Dukhi	1,234	0.88%	New
Jharkhand Party	Saroj Hemrom	1,228	0.87%	▼1.07
NOTA	None of the Above	3,266	2.32%	▲0.97
Margin of victory		7,667	5.45%	▲2.35
Turnout		1,40,598	63.60%	▲2.88
Registered electors		2,21,055		▲3.42
JMM gain from BJP		Swing	▲9.06	

=== Assembly election 2014 ===
2014 Jharkhand Legislative Assembly election: Gumla
Party	Candidate	Votes	%	±%
BJP	Shivshankar Oraon	50,473	38.89%	▲0.61
JMM	Bhushan Tirkey	46,441	35.78%	▲9.20
INC	Binod Kispotta	12,847	9.90%	▼10.74
SP	Sunil Kullu	5,231	4.03%	New
CPI	Binod Kerketta	2,571	1.98%	New
Jharkhand Party	Handu Bhagat	2,526	1.95%	New
Independent	Dhaneshwar Toppo	1,493	1.15%	New
NOTA	None of the Above	1,753	1.35%	New
Margin of victory		4,032	3.11%	▼8.59
Turnout		1,29,797	60.73%	▲2.46
Registered electors		2,13,739		▲20.51
BJP hold		Swing	▲0.61	

=== Assembly election 2009 ===
2009 Jharkhand Legislative Assembly election: Gumla
Party	Candidate	Votes	%	±%
BJP	Kamlesh Oraon	39,555	38.28%	▲6.16
JMM	Bhushan Tirkey	27,468	26.58%	▼6.32
INC	Joy Fredric Baxla	21,329	20.64%	New
Independent	Brajkishore Bhagat	1,868	1.81%	New
RJD	Ghanshyam Chandra Pahan	1,436	1.39%	New
Independent	Salim Toppo	1,167	1.13%	New
AJSU	Ajit Neelam Kerketta	1,021	0.99%	New
Margin of victory		12,087	11.70%	▲10.91
Turnout		1,03,337	58.27%	▼3.12
Registered electors		1,77,355		▼1.23
BJP gain from JMM		Swing	▲5.37	

=== Assembly election 2005 ===
2005 Jharkhand Legislative Assembly election: Gumla
Party	Candidate	Votes	%	±%
JMM	Bhushan Tirkey	36,266	32.90%	▲5.13
BJP	Sudarshan Bhagat	35,397	32.11%	▼4.01
Jharkhand Party	Barnabas Hembrom	4,079	3.70%	New
Independent	Dheerendra Prasad Singh	3,354	3.04%	New
Independent	Gyanmani Ekka	3,294	2.99%	New
BSP	Drothia Tirkey	2,815	2.55%	New
JD(S)	Ghanshyam Chandra Pahan	1,953	1.77%	New
Margin of victory		869	0.79%	▼7.56
Turnout		1,10,221	61.38%	▲9.08
Registered electors		1,79,564		▲17.36
JMM gain from BJP		Swing	▼3.22	

=== Assembly election 2000 ===
2000 Bihar Legislative Assembly election: Gumla
Party	Candidate	Votes	%	±%
BJP	Sudarshan Bhagat	28,905	36.12%	New
JMM	Bernard Minj	22,228	27.78%	New
INC	Bairagi Oraon	15,342	19.17%	New
RJD	Handu Bhagat	3,599	4.50%	New
Independent	Jitbahan Baraik	2,967	3.71%	New
SP	Anthony Lakra	2,600	3.25%	New
Independent	Shivshankar Bhagat	1,969	2.46%	New
Margin of victory		6,677	8.34%	
Turnout		80,025	53.23%	
Registered electors		1,53,003		
BJP win (new seat)				

== See also ==
- Vidhan Sabha
- List of states of India by type of legislature
