= Venkateshwar Reddy =

Indian politician from Telangana

G Venkateshwar Reddy
- In office 2013–2016
- Preceded by: Oscar Fernandes

Vice Chairman of MSME

Personal details
- Born: 14 May 1981 (age 44) Dilsukhnagar, Hyderabad district
- Party: Indian National Congress
- Spouse: Prathyusha Gunreddy
- Children: Naineisha Reddy Gunreddy , Aarshiv Reddy Gunreddy
- Occupation: Politician , Business man

G Venkateshwar Reddy (born 14 May 1981) is a politician from Indian National Congress from Telangana. The government appointed him as the Vice-chairman of the National Board of Micro, Small & Medium Enterprises for a term of three years 2013-2016.

== Ministry of Micro, Small & Medium Enterprises ==
The government appointed G Venkateshwar Reddy as the Vice-chairman of the National Board of Micro, Small & Medium Enterprises (NBMSME) for a period of three years (2013-2016) He helped many entrepreneurs by granting loans and advances under Prime Minister Employment Generation Programme which was under his supervision. He helped nearly 5000 new entrepreneurs throughout the country with the Scheme PMEGP (Prime Minister Employment Generation Programme). He has conducted awareness programmes at Hyderabad and Bangalore and also all over the country and he has also conducted EDP Programmes to new entrepreneurs and students in NB-MSME, Hyderabad.

== Political career ==
From the age of intermediate, he took active participation in Congress party programmes and became a key party activist. He was elected as secretary of Indian Youth Congress in his college days. He was also elected as General Secretary Greater Hyderabad Youth Congress Committee. He is the present TPCC general secretary.

== Positions held ==
- Vice Chairman, MSME
- State General Secretary, TPCC
- Secretary youth congress
- General secretary Greater Hyderabad Committee
