= Rukshmani Kumari =

Indian politician

President of All India Professionals Congress
- Constituency: Rajasthan
- Incumbent
- Assumed office 26 January 2018

Personal details
- Born: 14 July 1979 (age 47)
- Party: Indian National Congress
- Spouse: Major Aditya Singh (d. 2011)
- Education: Mayo College Girls School

Rukshmani Kumari (born 1979) is an Indian politician, affiliated with Indian National Congress, who is currently serving as the Rajasthan state unit president of All India Professionals Congress, the professional wing of Indian National Congress in Rajasthan.

She is member of Rajasthan Pradesh Congress Committee. Kumari hails from the erstwhile noble family of Chomu Thikana.

== Career ==
On 26 January 2018, Kumari was appointed as the Rajasthan President of All India Professionals Congress, the professional wing of Indian National Congress. In 2016, she founded an NGO called Star Foundation, which works for the development of women and underprivileged children in rural Rajasthan. She also serves as the president of Rajasthan Women Football Association.

== Personal life ==
She was married to Major Aditya Singh, who was martyred in 2011, during an operation in Kashmir.

== Other activities ==
Kumari voiced her opposition to any "factual distortion" in the 2018 Deepika-Ranveer starer film, Padmaavat, along with Gajendra Singh Shekhawat and Diya Kumari, reportedly by New Indian Express.

== See also ==
- All India Professionals Congress
- Indian National Congress
- Rajasthan Pradesh Congress Committee
