= Bhushan Tirkey =

Indian politician

Member of Jharkhand Legislative Assembly
- Incumbent
- Assumed office 2019
- Preceded by: Shivshankar Oraon

Member of Jharkhand Legislative Assembly
- In office 2005–2009
- Preceded by: Sudarshan Bhagat
- Succeeded by: Kamlesh Oraon
- Constituency: Gumla

Personal details
- Born: Bhushan Tirkey; 1970 (age 55–56) Gumla
- Party: JMM
- Parent: Amanuwal Tirkey (father)

Bhushan Tirkey (born 1970) is an Indian politician from Jharkhand Mukti Morcha. He is the member of Jharkhand Legislative Assembly representing Gumla Assembly Constituency since 2019.
