= JPCC =

JPCC may refer to:

- Jyllands-Posten Muhammad cartoons controversy
- Journal of Physical Chemistry C
- Jharkhand Pradesh Congress Committee, state wing of the Indian National Congress in Jharkhand
