= CPCC =

CPCC can refer to:

- Civilian Planning and Conduct Capability, the headquarters of European Union civilian missions
- Central Piedmont Community College
- The Canadian Playing Card Company
- Chandigarh Pradesh Congress Committee or Chandigarh Territorial Congress Committee (CTCC), branch of the Indian National Congress in Chandigarh
- Chhattisgarh Pradesh Congress Committee, branch of the Indian National Congress in Chhattisgarh
