= Silli Assembly constituency =

Constituency of the Jharkhand legislative assembly in India

Coordinates: 23.35°N 85.85°E

Silli
- Constituency No. 61 for the Jharkhand Legislative Assembly

Constituency details
- Country: India
- Region: East India
- State: Jharkhand
- District: Ranchi
- Lok Sabha constituency: Ranchi
- Established: 2000
- Total electors: 205,955
- Reservation: None

Member of Legislative Assembly
- 6th Jharkhand Legislative Assembly
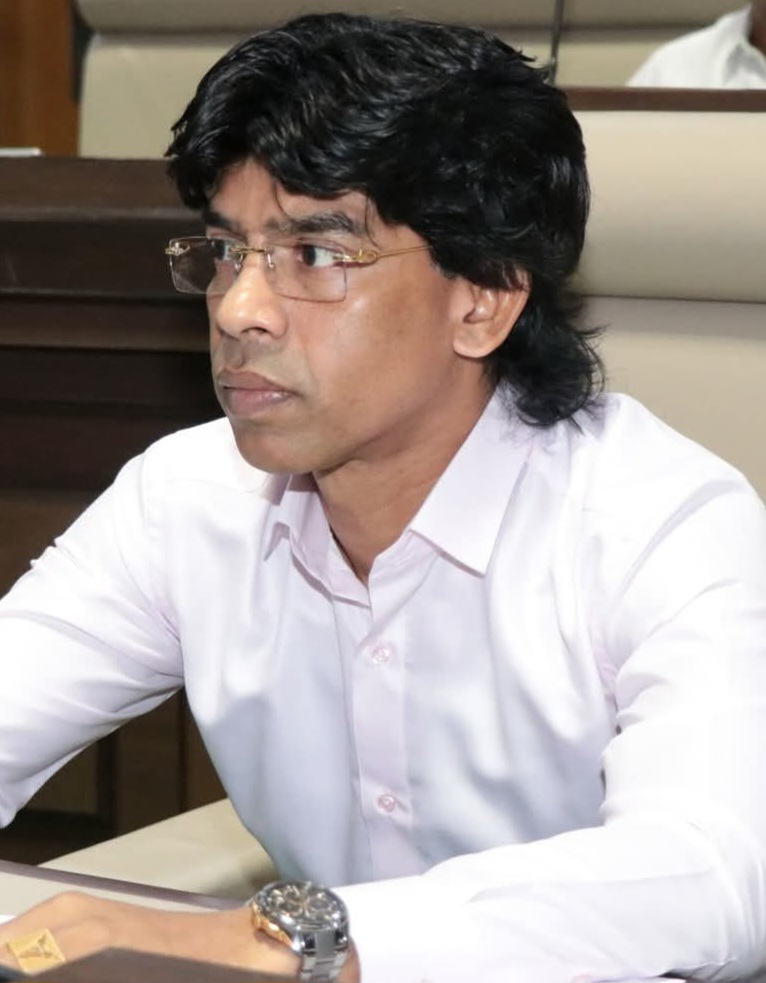
- Incumbent Amit Mahto
- Party: JMM
- Alliance: MGB
- Elected year: 2024

Silli Assembly constituency is an assembly constituency in the Indian state of Jharkhand.

Most successful parties after separate Jharkhand state.
1. AJSU (50.0%)
2. JMM (50.0%)

== Members of the Legislative Assembly ==
Election	Member	Party
Bihar Legislative Assembly
1952	Bhola Nath Bhagat	Indian National Congress
1957	Bhola Nath Bhagat	Indian National Congress
1962	Jageswar Chowdhary	Swatantra Party
1967	Brindawan Swansi	Jan Kranti Dal
1969	Brindawan Swansi	Shoshit Dal
1972	Ram Ratan Ram	Indian National Congress
1977	Rajendra Singh	Communist Party of India
1980	Rajendra Singh	Communist Party of India
1985	Keshav Mahto Kamlesh	Indian National Congress
1990	Rajendra Singh	Communist Party of India
1995	Keshav Mahto Kamlesh	Indian National Congress
2000	Sudesh Mahto	United Goans Democratic Party
Jharkhand Legislative Assembly
2005	Sudesh Mahto	All Jharkhand Students Union
2009	Sudesh Mahto	All Jharkhand Students Union
2014	Amit Mahto	Jharkhand Mukti Morcha
2018^	Seema Devi	Jharkhand Mukti Morcha
2019	Sudesh Mahto	All Jharkhand Students Union
2024	Amit Mahto	Jharkhand Mukti Morcha

^by-election

== Election results ==
=== Assembly election 2024 ===
2024 Jharkhand Legislative Assembly election: Silli
Party	Candidate	Votes	%	±%
JMM	Amit Mahto	73,169	41.91	▲1.90
AJSU	Sudesh Mahto	49,302	28.24	▼24.50
JLKM	Devendra Nath Mahto	41,725	23.90	New
Independent	Hemanti Devi	1,620	0.93	New
Independent	Vikas Singh Munda	1,449	0.83	New
BAP	Anil Singh Munda	1,137	0.65	New
NOTA	None of the Above	1,313	0.75	▲0.08
Margin of victory		23,867	13.67	▲0.95
Turnout		1,74,572	77.66	▲0.60
Registered electors		2,24,794		▲9.15
JMM gain from AJSU		Swing	▼10.82	

=== Assembly election 2019 ===
2019 Jharkhand Legislative Assembly election: Silli
Party	Candidate	Votes	%	±%
AJSU	Sudesh Mahto	83,700	52.74	New
JMM	Seema Devi	63,505	40.01	▼12.27
CPI(M)	Bishwadeo Singh Munda	2,766	1.74	New
Independent	Amit Mahto	2,018	1.27	New
Independent	Devendra Nath Mahto	1,445	0.91	New
NOTA	None of the Above	1,062	0.67	▼0.93
Margin of victory		20,195	12.72	▲3.57
Turnout		1,58,708	77.06	▲1.21
Registered electors		2,05,955		▲5.89
AJSU gain from JMM		Swing	▲0.45	

=== Assembly by-election 2018 ===
2018 Jharkhand Legislative Assembly by-election: Silli
Party	Candidate	Votes	%	±%
JMM	Seema Devi	77,129	52.28	▼3.40
AJSU	Sudesh Mahto	63,619	43.13	New
Independent	Amit Singh Munda	1,239	0.84	New
Independent	Seema Devi	1,048	0.71	New
RLSP	Jyoti Prasad	809	0.55	New
NOTA	None of the Above	2,357	1.60	New
Margin of victory		13,510	9.16	▼11.61
Turnout		1,47,517	74.63	▼1.82
Registered electors		1,94,497		▲5.48
JMM hold		Swing	▼3.40	

=== Assembly election 2014 ===
2014 Jharkhand Legislative Assembly election: Silli
Party	Candidate	Votes	%	±%
JMM	Amit Mahto	79,747	55.69	▲52.54
AJSU	Sudesh Mahto	50,007	34.92	▼4.07
CPI(M)	Rangowati Devi	3,279	2.29	▼1.41
INC	Dinesh Prasad Sahu	2,267	1.58	▼4.69
JVM(P)	Robin Sahu	1,042	0.73	▼31.68
SAP	Trilochan Prasad Mahto	995	0.69	New
Independent	Sanjay Prasad Yadav	942	0.66	New
NOTA	None of the Above	2,781	1.94	New
Margin of victory		29,740	20.77	▲14.19
Turnout		1,43,205	77.66	▲7.87
Registered electors		1,84,393		▲9.86
JMM gain from AJSU		Swing	▲16.70	

=== Assembly election 2009 ===
2009 Jharkhand Legislative Assembly election: Silli
Party	Candidate	Votes	%	±%
AJSU	Sudesh Mahto	45,673	38.99	▲11.28
JVM(P)	Amit Mahto	37,966	32.41	New
INC	Keshav Mahto Kamlesh	7,348	6.27	New
CPI(M)	Suphal Kumar Mahto	4,336	3.70	▼6.00
Independent	Sawan Kumar Bedia	3,729	3.18	New
JMM	Dinesh Kumar Mahto	3,683	3.14	▼10.94
Independent	Shukhdev Manjhi	2,536	2.16	New
Margin of victory		7,707	6.58	▼7.04
Turnout		1,17,147	69.80	▲6.81
Registered electors		1,67,840		▼25.44
AJSU hold		Swing	▲11.28	

=== Assembly election 2005 ===
2005 Jharkhand Legislative Assembly election: Silli
Party	Candidate	Votes	%	±%
AJSU	Sudesh Mahto	39,281	27.71	New
JMM	Amit Mahto	19,969	14.08	▲13.49
CPI(M)	Sanjay Kumar Sidharth	13,755	9.70	▼5.52
UGDP	Mathura Prashad Sahu	9,017	6.36	▼38.33
AIFB	Chaudhary Mahto	2,793	1.97	New
Independent	Krishan Kumar Mahto	2,264	1.60	New
JD(U)	Raja Ram Mahto	2,022	1.43	New
Margin of victory		19,312	13.62	▼2.49
Turnout		1,41,779	62.98	▲1.20
Registered electors		2,25,100		▲54.15
AJSU gain from UGDP		Swing	▼16.99	

=== Assembly election 2000 ===
2000 Bihar Legislative Assembly election: Silli
Party	Candidate	Votes	%	±%
UGDP	Sudesh Mahto	40,322	44.69	
INC	Keshaw Mahto Kamlesh	25,784	28.58	
CPI(M)	Rajendra Singh Munda	13,736	15.23	
BJP	Pasupati Nath Mahto	3,933	4.36	
CPI(ML)L	Santosh Munda	3,006	3.33	
SAP	Chhatrapati Shahi Munda.	1,023	1.13	
JMM	Vinod Kumar Mahto	533	0.59	
Margin of victory		14,538	16.11	
Turnout		90,218	62.72	
Registered electors		1,46,024		
UGDP win (new seat)				

== See also ==
- Vidhan Sabha
- List of states of India by type of legislature
- Jharkhand Legislative Assembly
