= Rameshwar Oraon =

Indian politician

Dr. Rameshwar Oraon
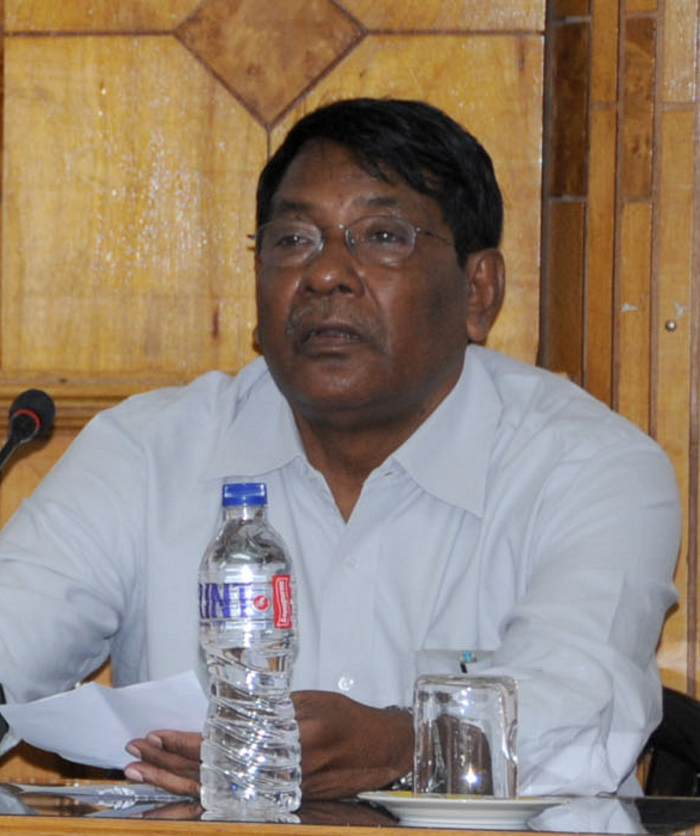

Cabinet Minister, Government of Jharkhand
- In office 29 December 2019 – 5 December 2024
- Governor: Draupadi Murmu; Ramesh Bais; C. P. Radhakrishnan
- Chief Minister: Hemant Soren; Champai Soren
- Ministry and Departments: Finance.; Planning.; Commercial Tax.; Food, Public distribution and Consumer affairs.
- Preceded by: Raghubar Das
- Succeeded by: Radha Krishna Kishore

President Jharkhand Pradesh Congress Committee
- In office 26 August 2019 – 25 August 2021
- Preceded by: Ajoy Kumar
- Succeeded by: Rajesh Thakur

Member of the Jharkhand Legislative Assembly
- Incumbent
- Assumed office 23 December 2019
- Preceded by: Sukhdeo Bhagat
- Constituency: Lohardaga

Member of Parliament Lok Sabha
- In office 13 May 2004 – 18 May 2009
- Preceded by: Dukha Bhagat
- Succeeded by: Sudarshan Bhagat
- Constituency: Lohardaga

Minister of State for Tribal Affairs Government of India
- In office 22 May 2004 – 23 May 2009
- Constituency: Lohardaga

Personal details
- Born: 14 February 1947 (age 79) Daltonganj, Bihar Province, British India, (present-day Medininagar, Jharkhand, India)
- Party: Indian National Congress
- Spouse: Ragini Minz
- Children: 1 son (Rohit Oraon) and 1 daughter (Nisha Oraon Singhmar)
- As of 25 September 2018

Rameshwar Oraon (born 14 February 1947) is an Indian politician from Jharkhand. He served as the Finance Minister of Jharkhand and was also a member of the 14th Lok Sabha. He represented the Lohardaga constituency of Jharkhand and is a member of the Indian National Congress Party. He is a member of the Jharkhand Legislative Assembly.

== Early life and education ==
Oraon is from Kanke, Jharkhand. He was born in Daltonganj, in the erstwhile Bihar state. He is a retired IPS officer. He completed his doctorate in 1997 at Magadh University, Patna. Earlier, he did his M.A. in economics in 1970 and B.A. Hons in 1967 at Ranchi University, Ranchi.

== Career ==
Oraon is a former Indian Police Service officer of the 1972 batch. He is a recipient of the President's Police medal. He resigned the service in 2004 to contest the general election and won on Congress ticket.

== Political career ==
Oraon was chairperson of the National Commission for Scheduled Tribes from 28 October 2010 to 27 October 2013 during his first term, and continued till 26 August 2017 for his second term. He is thus an ex officio member of the National Human Rights Commission (NHRC).

Oraon served as the Member of Parliament, 14th Lok Sabha. On 26 August 2019, he was appointed by the Congress, as the new president of Jharkhand State unit. He also served as the Union Minister of State for Tribal affairs in Government of India headed by Manmohan Singh. He won the 2019 Jharkhand Legislative Assembly election from Lohardaga Assembly constituency and became a minister in the Jharkhand government. He defeated Bharatiya Janata Party candidate, Sukhdeo Bhagat.

On 29 December 2019, he was sworn in as the Cabinet Minister in the Government of Jharkhand, headed by Chief Minister Hemant Soren, along with Alamgir Alam and Satyanand Bhokta.

The Enforcement Directorate conducted raids at premises linked to his son in alleged liquor scam in August 2023. The Congress leaders denied the allegations and slammed the BJP government for the searches.

SI No.	Year	Lok Sabha	Constituency	Margin	Party	Post
1.	2004	14th	Lohardaga	90,255	INC	Union Minister of State, Government of India

=== Jharkhand Legislative Assembly ===
SI No.	Year	Legislative Assembly	Constituency	Margin	Party	Post
1.	2019	5th	Lohardaga	30,150	INC	Finance Minister, Government of Jharkhand

== Awards ==
- He received President Police Medal during his Police Service.
