= Amit Mahto =

Indian politician

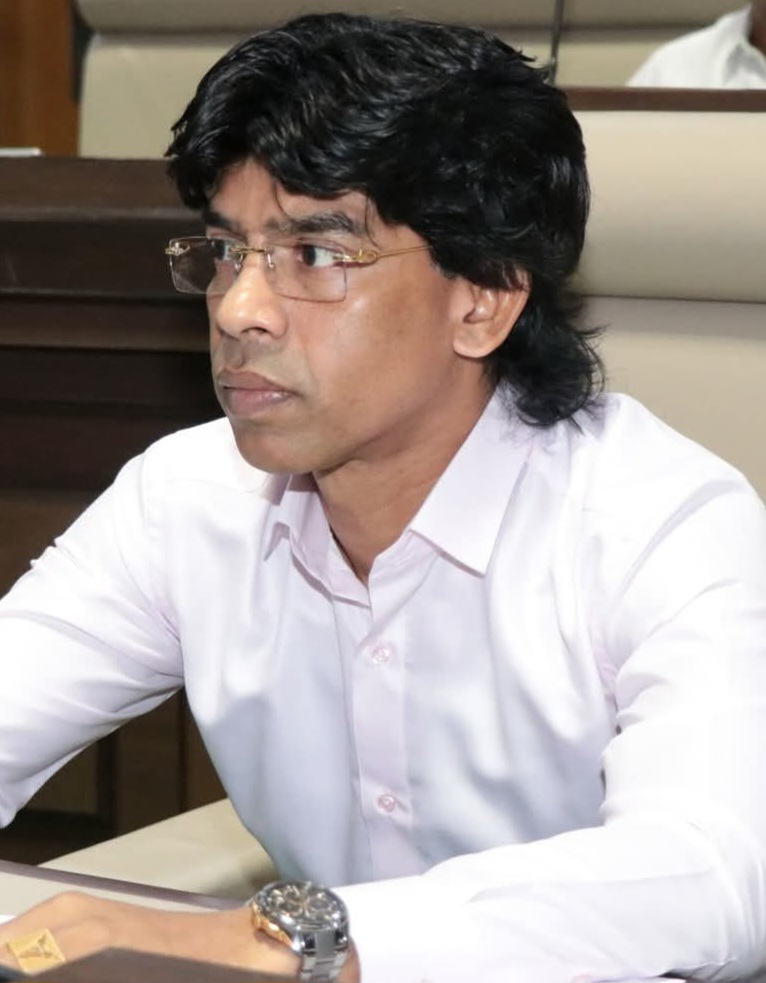

Member of Jharkhand Legislative Assembly
- Incumbent
- Assumed office 24 November 2024
- Constituency: Silli
- Preceded by: Sudesh Mahto

Personal details
- Born: Amit Mahto; 1989 (age 36–37)
- Party: Jharkhand Mukti Morcha
- Relations: Santosh Kumar Mahto (Father)
- Education: Birla Institute of Technology Mesra (B.E)
- Occupation: Politician

Amit Mahto (born 1989) is an Indian politician and a member of the Jharkhand Legislative Assembly from Silli and won Vidhan Sabha election in 2014. He was a member of Jharkhand Mukti Morcha and considered the face of youth in the Jharkhand Political Party. Former JMM MLA from Silli, Amit Mahto has resigned from the party, accused the leadership of compromising the interest of the people of Jharkhand and forming a new political party Khatiyani Jharkhandi Party on 6 April 2022 to give rights to the local Khatiyani People of Jharkhand.

== Early life ==
Since childhood he was sagacious towards education and completed Bachelor of Engineering (civil) Birla Institute of Technology, Mesra, Ranchi in 2003.

== Revolutionary ==
During the school days he came under the influence of well renowned freedom fighter of the region Binod Bihari Mahato and Nirmal Mahto who gave him initiation and motivated towards the freedom struggle.

== See also ==
- Jharkhand Legislative Assembly
- Politics of India
- Jharkhand Mukti Morcha
