= Bomma Mahesh Kumar Goud =

Indian politician from Telangana

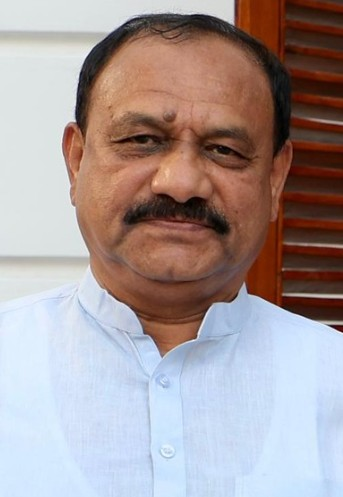
- Bomma Mahesh Kumar Goud in 2025

4th President of the Telangana Pradesh Congress Committee
- Incumbent
- Assumed office 6 September 2024
- AICC President: Mallikarjun Kharge
- Preceded by: Anumula Revanth Reddy

Member of Telangana Legislative Council
- Incumbent
- Assumed office 22 January 2024
- Preceded by: Kadiyam Srihari
- Constituency: Elected by MLAs

Personal details
- Born: 24 May 1966 (age 59) Rahamat Nagar, Bheemgal Mandal, Nizamabad District, Telangana, India
- Party: Indian National Congress
- Spouse: Sandhya Rani
- Children: Rithwik Goud, Pranav Goud
- Parents: Bomma Gangadhar Goud (father); Bomma Mannemma (mother)

Bomma Mahesh Kumar Goud is an Indian politician from Telangana. He is currently serving as President of Telangana Pradesh Congress Committee from 6 September 2024. He was elected unanimously as member of the Telangana Legislative Council under the MLA quota on 22 January 2024.

He was the Working President of Telangana Pradesh Congress Committee from 28 June 2021 to 6 September 2024.

== Political career ==
Mahesh Kumar Goud started his political journey with NSUI and later he was the NSUI State President in the 90's and held various positions in the Congress party. He contested the 1994 assembly elections as a Congress candidate from Ditchpally constituency at a young age and lost. Mahesh Kumar served as Chairman of Andhra Pradesh State Warehousing Corporation from 2013 to 2014. Mahesh Kumar Unsuccessfully contested from Nizamabad Urban constituency in 2014 assembly elections and later that he worked as PCC Secretary, Spokesperson and PCC General Secretary.

Mahesh Kumar Goud was appointed as the TPCC working president on 26 June 2021, and later appointed asa special invitee in TPCC Political Affairs Executive Committee on 10 December 2022. Mahesh Kumar Goud played a pivotal role in coordinating the party cadre and leaders. He was a strong aspirant for the Nizamabad Urban seat in 2023 Telangana Legislative Elections he was convinced to sacrifice his seat to former Minister Md. Ali Shabbir the TPCC chief A. Revanth Reddy's decision to contest from Kamareddy seat.

Bomma Mahesh Kumar Goud's candidature was announced for member of the Legislative Council (MLC) under the MLAs' quota on 17 January 2024 and filed his nomination on 18 January 2024 and as no other nomination was filed from others, the election authorities declared him elected unopposed as MLC on 22 January 2024 and he took oath as Member of the Legislative Council (MLC) on 31 January 2024 in Legislative council chairman Gutha Sukender Reddy's chamber.

Mahesh Kumar Goud was appointed as President of Telangana Pradesh Congress Committee on 6 September 2024 and took charge on 15 September 2024 at Gandhi Bhavan in Hyderabad.
