= Mohan Prakash =

Indian politician

AICC (I/C) Bihar
- In office 23 December 2023 – February 2025
- President: Mallikarjun Kharge
- Preceded by: Bhakta Charan Das
- Succeeded by: Krishna Allavaru

Member of Rajasthan Legislative Assembly
- In office 1985–1990
- Preceded by: Pradyuman Singh
- Succeeded by: Pradyuman Singh
- Constituency: Rajakhera

Personal details
- Born: 26 December 1950 (age 75)
- Party: Indian National Congress

Mohan Prakash is one of the general secretaries of INC. He is one of the spokespersons in Indian National Congress. He has been MLA once from Rajakhera, District Dholpur (Rajasthan).

== Personal life ==
Prakash was born on 26 December 1950. His father was Mangal Singh. He obtained a master's of art degree at M.G. Kashi Vidyapeeth, Varanasi) and a bachelor of journalism degree from B.H.U.. He was an MLA from Rajakera constituency of Dholpur district and one of the most prominent leaders of Congress.
