= Sudarshan Bhagat =

Indian politician

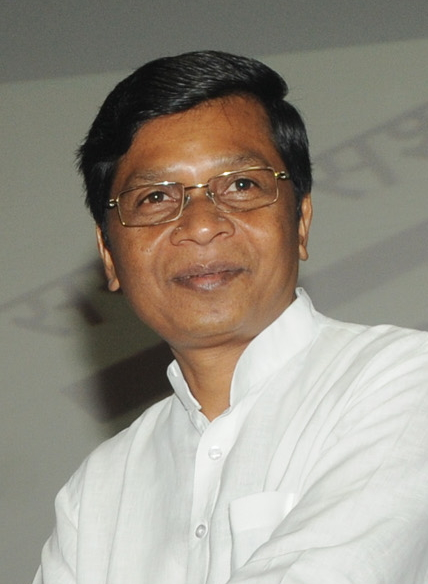

Minister of State Government of India
- In office 26 May 2014 – 30 May 2019
- Ministry: Term
- Minister of Tribal Affairs: 3 September 2017 - 30 May 2019
- Minister of Agriculture: 5 July 2016 - 3 September 2017
- Minister of Rural Development: 9 November 2014 - 5 July 2016
- Minister of Social Justice & Empowerment: 26 May 2014 - 9 November 2014

Member of Parliament, Lok Sabha
- In office 2009–2024
- Preceded by: Rameshwar Oraon
- Succeeded by: Sukhdeo Bhagat
- Constituency: Lohardaga

Minister of State Government of Jharkhand
- In office 2000–2005
- Ministry: Term
- Minister of Welfare: 2004 - 05
- Minister of Sports, Art & Culture Minister of Animal Husbandry & Dairy: 2003 - 04
- Minister of Human Resources Development: 2000 - 03

Member of Jharkhand Legislative Assembly
- In office 2000–2005
- Preceded by: Bernard Minj
- Succeeded by: Bhushan Tirkey
- Constituency: Gumla

Personal details
- Born: 20 October 1969 (age 55); Tangardih, Gumla district, Bihar (Presently Jharkhand)
- Political party: Bharatiya Janata Party
- Spouse: Krishana Toppo (m. 2001)
- Children: 2 sons
- Parents: Late Shri Kalsai Bhagat (father); Smt. Manna Devi (mother)
- Education: Bachelor of Arts
- Alma mater: Ranchi University

Sudarshan Bhagat (born 20 October 1969; Hindi pronunciation: [sʊd̪əɾʃən̪ bʱəgət̪]) is Kurukh Indian politician Bharatiya Janata Party. He is a member of the Indian Parliament, and represented Lohardaga (Lok Sabha constituency). He was the Minister of State for Tribal Affairs in the Narendra Modi government from 2014 to 2019.

== Political career ==
Bhagat was elected to Bihar Legislative Assembly from Gumla constituency in 2000. After Jharkhand's formation in 2000, he was inducted as Minister of State in Babulal Marandi ministry. He continued as Minister in Arjun Munda ministry till 2005. In 2005 Jharkhand Assembly election, he had lost from Gumla constituency to Bhushan Tirkey of JMM by a meagre margin of 869 votes. He was elected as a Member of Parliament, Lok Sabha from Lohardaga constituency. He was re-elected again in 2014 & 2019. He was inducted in First Modi ministry during which he oversaw the Ministry of Social Justice & Empowerment, Rural Development, Agriculture & Tribal Affairs as a Union Minister of State. In 2024 election, he was denied ticket from Lohardaga constituency in favor of Sameer Oraon, Member of Rajya Sabha. However Sameer Oraon lost to Sukhdeo Bhagat of INC by a margin of 1,39,138 votes.

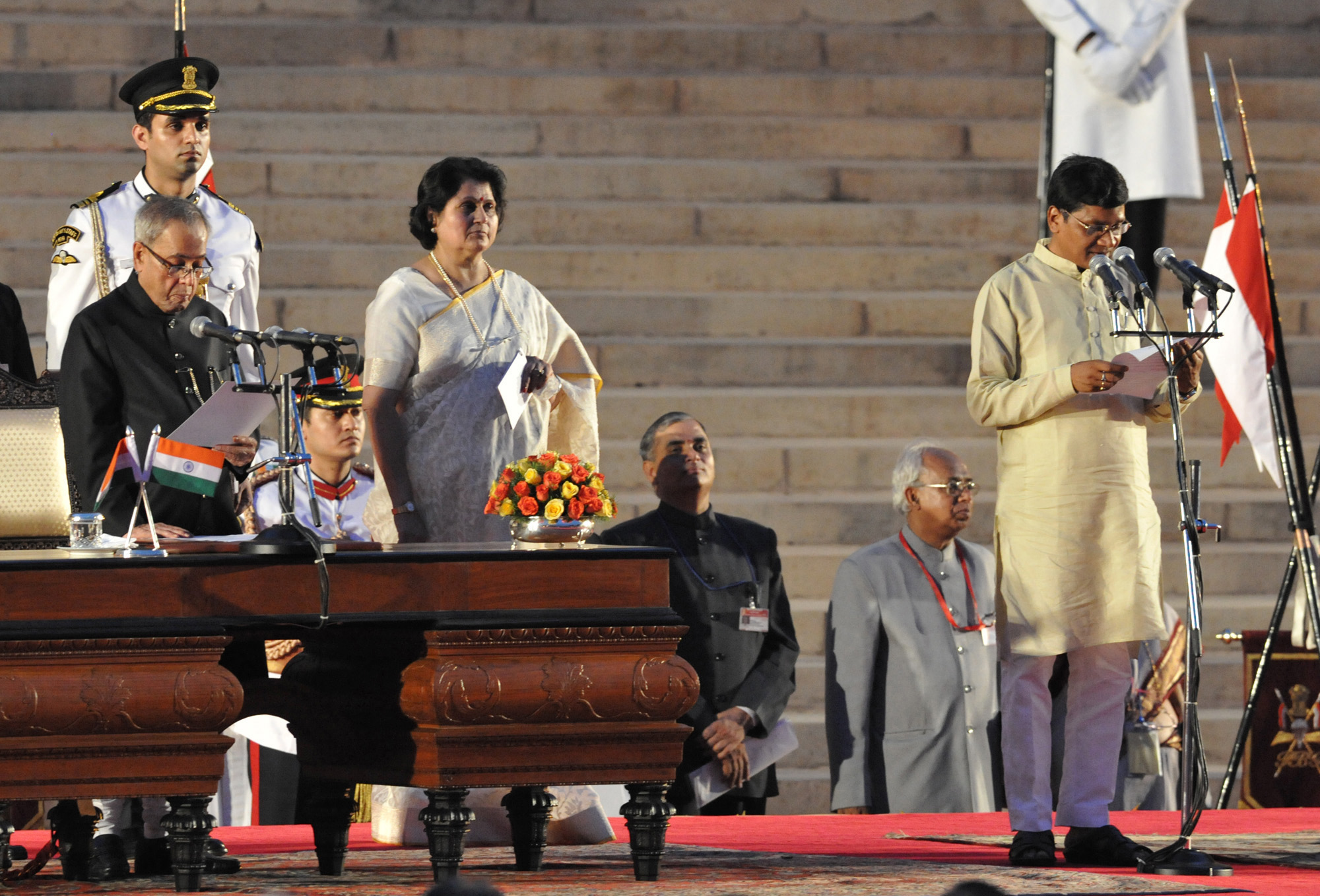
The President, Shri Pranab Mukherjee administering the oath as Minister of State to Shri Sudarshan Bhagat, at a Swearing-in Ceremony, at Rashtrapati Bhavan, in New Delhi on May 26, 2014.jpg
