= Choithram Gidwani =

Dr Choitram Partabrai Gidwani
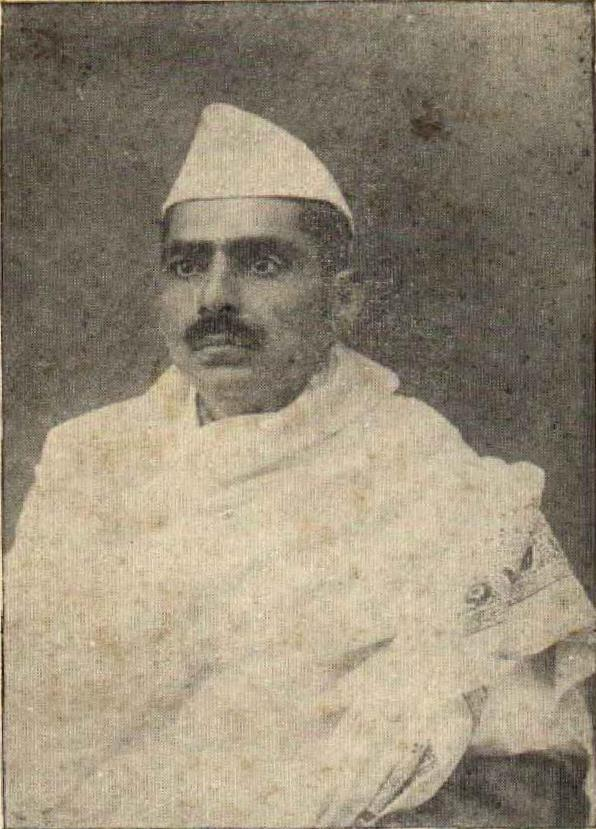
- Choitram Gidwani
- Born: Choitram Partabrai Gidwani; 25 December 1889; Hyderabad, Sindh
- Died: 13 September 1957 (aged 67); Bombay
- Known for: Civil Disobedience Movement, Quit India Movement
- Title: Member of Parliament, Lok Sabha
- Term: 1952-1957
- Successor: Shamrao Vishnu Parulekar
- Political party: Praja Socialist Party (PSP)

Dr. Choithram Gidwani was born at Hyderabad (Sind) on 25 December 1889 and received his entire education there. After passing the matriculation examination his spirit of service impelled him to accept a teacher's job at Bubak in Dadu District, but finding little scope for his activities there he chucked it up returning to Hyderabad, he joined the Medical School there, and after completing the course he entered Government service as a Medical Officer. Dr. Choithram came in contact with Mahatma Gandhi at the Congress Session held in Bombay in 1915. In the following year, he attended the Session at Lucknow as a delegate from Sind. He successfully organised 'hartal' at Hyderabad in March 1919 in protest against the Rowlatt Act. Dr. Choithram was sent to jail several times, first in 1922 when as editor of the "Hindu" his writings were regarded as seditious; then in 1930 when he broke the Salt Law at Karachi; again during the Civil Disobedience Movement of 1932 and also in 1933 for defying the Govt. orders not to leave Hyderabad; in 1940 for making a fiery speech at Lahore; and finally in 1942 for joining the Quit India Movement launched by Gandhiji. Whenever outside jail, besides attending to his political activities he did valuable humanitarian work such as running a charitable dispensary, supplying medicines to the poor and the needy free of charge, collecting donations for Pathshalas and Narishalas, organising relief work during floods and earthquakes as also during communal riots, and taking measures to prevent persecution of one community at the hands of the other. He died in the Northcote Nursing Home at Bombay on the night of 13 September 1957. Dr. Choithram was an embodiment of service and self-sacrifice. Way back in 1924 Gandhiji wrote about him in the Young India - "He has sacrificed everything and turned into a 'Faqir' all for the cause of his country."
