= Sukhdeo Bhagat =

Indian politician

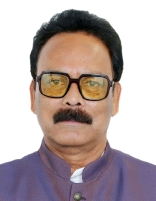

Member of Parliament, Lok Sabha
- Incumbent
- Assumed office 4 June 2024
- Preceded by: Sudarshan Bhagat
- Constituency: Lohardaga

President, Jharkhand Pradesh Congress Committee
- In office May 2013 – November 2017
- Preceded by: Pradeep Kumar Balmuchu
- Succeeded by: Ajoy Kumar

Member of Jharkhand Legislative Assembly
- In office 2015–2019
- Preceded by: Kamal Kishore Bhagat
- Succeeded by: Rameshwar Oraon
- Constituency: Lohardaga

Personal details
- Born: 22 October 1960 (age 65) Lohardaga, Jharkhand, India
- Party: Indian National Congress

Sukhdeo Bhagat (born 22 October 1960; Hindi pronunciation: [sʊkʰ.d̪eːʋ bʱəgət̪]) is an Indian politician who serves as the member of parliament representing Lohardaga Lok Sabha Constituency. He is member of Indian National Congress.

He also serves as the MLA in the Jharkhand Legislative Assembly representing Lohardaga Assembly constituency in Lohardaga district. He joined the BJP in 2019 and lost to Congress candidate Rameshwar Oraon in the Jharkhand assembly polls 2019. On 30 January 2022, Bhagat rejoined Congress.

== Career ==
Sukhdeo Bhagat won the Lohardaga seat, defeating BJP-backed All Jharkhand Students Union's (AJSU) candidate Niru Bhagat. He was appointed Jharkhand Congress president in May 2013.

== Positions held ==
Sukhdeo Bhagat has been serving as a member of the Joint Committee on the Constitution (One Hundred and Twenty-Ninth Amendment) Bill, 2024, and the Union Territories Laws (Amendment) Bill, 2024, since 20 December 2024. He is also a member of the Committee on Coal, Mines and Steel, a position he assumed on 26 September 2024. Bhagat was elected to the 18th Lok Sabha in June 2024. Previously, he served as an MLA in the Jharkhand Vidhan Sabha from 1 November 2015 to December 2019, and from 27 February 2005 to February 2010.
