= Praveen Chakravarty =

Indian politician

Praveen Chakravarthy

Member of Parliament, Rajya Sabha
- Incumbent
- Assumed office 21 June 2026
- Prime Minister: Narendra Modi
- Preceded by: C. Ve. Shanmugam
- Constituency: Tamil Nadu

Chairperson All India Professionals Congress
- In office 15 November 2023 – 9 September 2026
- Preceded by: Shashi Tharoor
- Succeeded by: Madhu Yaskhi Goud

Personal details
- Born: India
- Party: Indian National Congress
- Occupation: Politician; Venture Capital; Banking
- Website: www.praveenchakravarty.in

Praveen Chakravarthy is an Indian politician belonging to the Congress Party. He was elected to the Rajya Sabha, the upper house of Indian Parliament, from Tamil Nadu as a member of the Indian National Congress. He took over as chairperson of the All India Professionals' Congress from Shashi Tharoor on 15 November 2023. He is the Chairman of the Data Analytics department, appointed by Rahul Gandhi. He is the brains behind SHAKTI, a project that was created to modernise the Congress party. He along with P.Chidambaram drafted the NYAY scheme for the party's 2019 election manifesto with help from Nobel Laureate Prof. Abhijit Banerjee among others.

Chakravarty was a political economist scholar in a think tank, an investment banker and angel investor before entering politics. It was widely reported that Chakravarty will be the Congress candidate for Member of Parliament of the Upper House in 2026 from the state of Tamil Nadu.

Praveen Chakravarthy was appointed as a member of Empowered Action Group of Leaders and Experts (EAGLE) which was constituted by Indian National Congress on 2 February 2025 to monitor the conduct of free and fair elections by the Election Commission of India.

Chakravarthy has been nominated along with 6 others in the list for Rajya Sabha by-elections in June 2026.

== Career ==
Praveen Chakravarty started his career with IBM in Japan and moved to Microsoft. He switched to investment banking in New York and San Francisco, after receiving his MBA from Wharton School. Chakravarty moved to India to set up Thomas Weisel's India operations and 2 years later, captured headlines in a high-profile move to BNP Paribas as managing director with his entire team from Thomas Weisel. 4 years later, he joined Nandan Nilekani's team at Aadhaar.

He is a co-founder of Mumbai Angels and is ranked among the top five angel investors in the country by a survey. He was also a contributing editor at BloombergQuint where he hosted a popular monthly column called "Noise To Signal".

He then became a scholar in a think tank and published extensive research on India's economic divergence among its states.
