= Keshav Mahto Kamlesh =

Indian politician

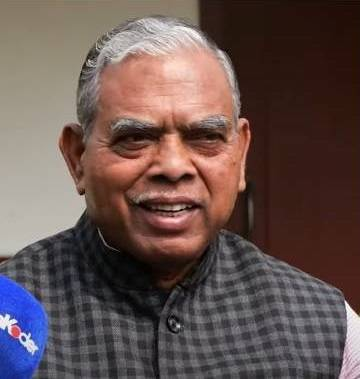
- Mahto in 2024

9th President Jharkhand Pradesh Congress Committee
- Incumbent
- Assumed office 16 August 2024
- Preceded by: Rajesh Thakur

Member of Jharkhand Legislative Assembly
- In office 1985–1990
- Preceded by: Rajendra Singh
- Constituency: Silli
- In office 1995–2000
- Succeeded by: Sudesh Mahto
- Constituency: Silli

Personal details
- Party: Indian National Congress
- Education: Post Graduate
- Profession: Jharkhand politician

Keshav Mahto Kamlesh is an Indian politician and a former member of the legislative assembly of Silli. Currently, he is serving as the president of the Jharkhand Pradesh Congress Committee (JPCC).

== Early life and career ==
He was born in the region of undivided Bihar and has been active in politics since the mid-1980s. He completed his master's degree from Ranchi University between 1976 and 1978.

Keshav first entered the political arena in 1985 when he was elected as an MLA from the Silli Assembly constituency and was re-elected in 1995.

After Jharkhand became a separate state in 2000, his influence continued as he remained an active figure within the INC.

On 16 August 2024, Keshav was appointed as the new president of the JPCC, succeeding Rajesh Thakur.
