= Madhu Goud Yaskhi =

Indian politician

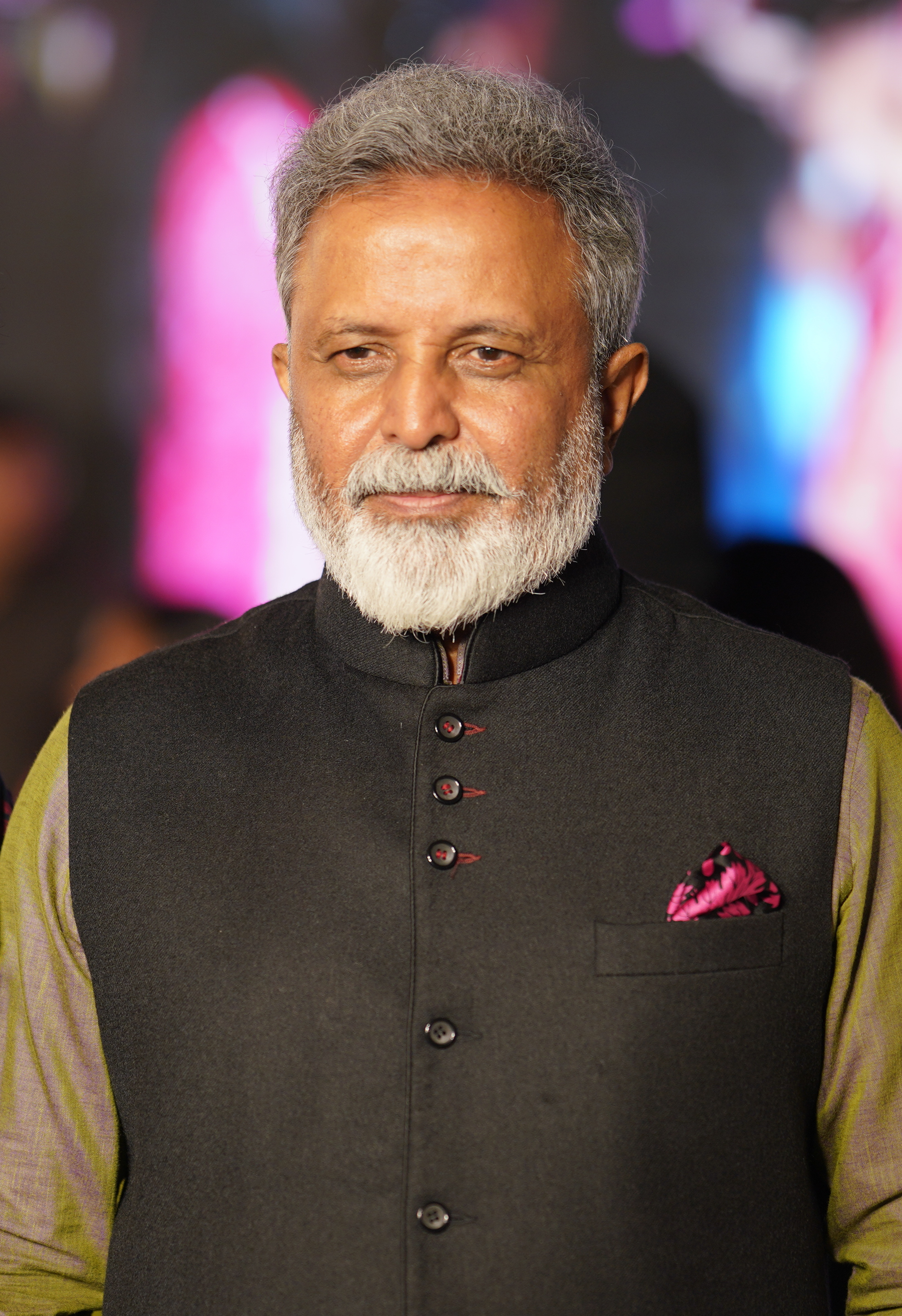

Chairperson All India Professionals Congress
- Incumbent
- Assumed office 9 September 2026
- Preceded by: Praveen Chakravarty

Member of Parliament, Lok Sabha
- In office 22 May 2004 – 26 May 2014
- Preceded by: Gaddam Ganga Reddy
- Succeeded by: K. Kavitha
- Constituency: Nizamabad

Personal details
- Born: 15 December 1960 (age 65) Hyderabad
- Party: Indian National Congress
- Spouse: Shuchee Madhu
- Children: 2 daughters
- Education: Nizam College; Faculty of Law, University of Delhi
- Website: http://www.madhuyaskhi.com
- As of 26 September, 2006

Madhu Goud Yaskhi (born 15 December 1960) was a member of the 14th Lok Sabha and 15th Lok Sabha of India. He represented the Nizamabad constituency of Telangana and is a member of the Indian National Congress (INC) political party.

He is a strong supporter for the formation of a new state in southern India, Telangana, for which the people are fighting to be carved out of the existing state of Andhra Pradesh and has popular support from the people of Telangana.

== Early life ==
Madhu Yaskhi was born on 15 December 1960 to Kistaiah Goud and Sulochana. He is the second among six sisters and three brothers. He was adopted by his father's younger brother Pochaiah Goud and Anasuya.

He has bachelor's degree in arts from Nizam College, Hyderabad in 1982. He also obtained an LLB from the University of Delhi in 1985 and LLM from P. G. College of Law, Hyderabad in 1989.

== Career ==
Madhu Yaskhi was a New York City attorney. He established International Legal and Trade Consultants. This organization provides legal assistance to people of Indian origin. Moved by the plight of farmers committing suicides due to crop failures and high debts, he left US and returned to India. He has a law firm in New York and Atlanta, still actively working through remote operations and few visits every few months

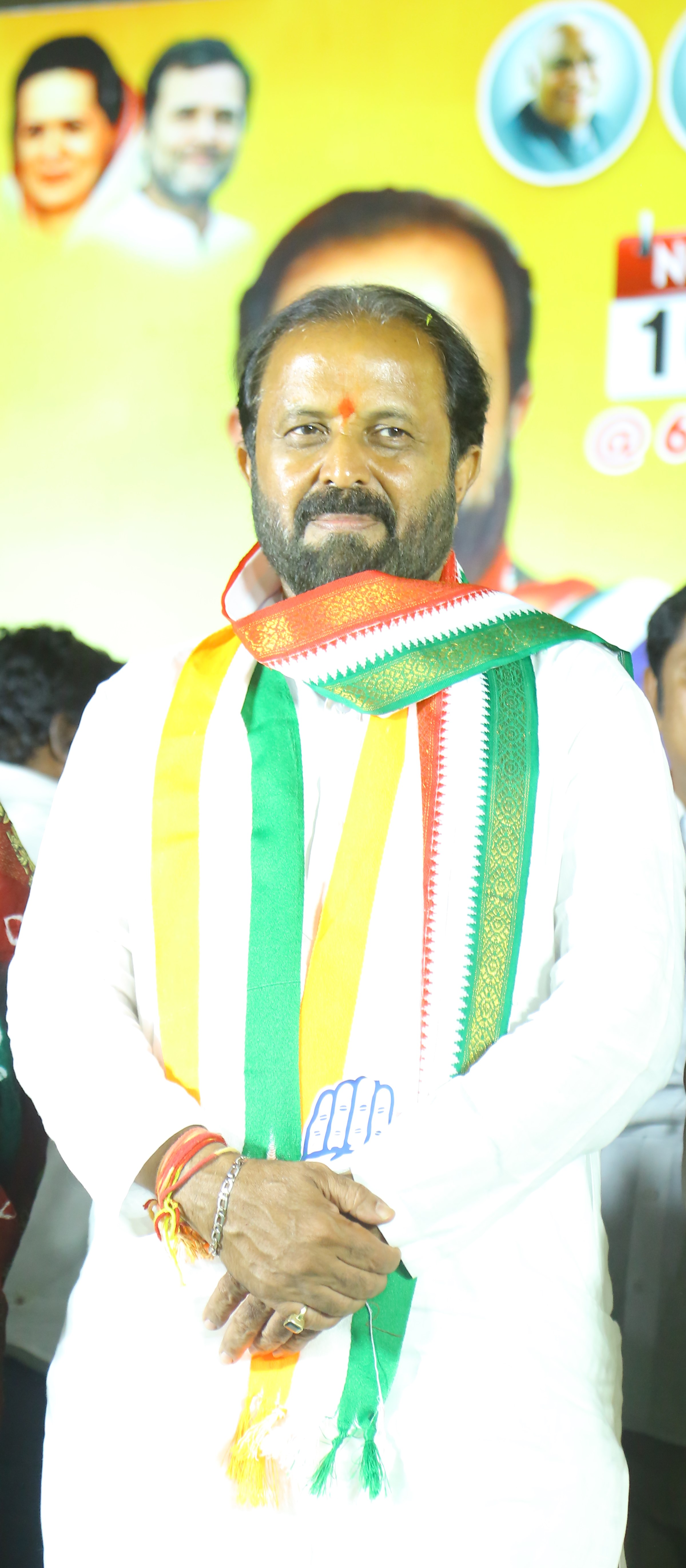
Madhu Yashki in 2023 Election Campaigning

=== Political career ===
In 2004, Madhu Yaskhi was elected as a Member of Parliament from Nizamabad. In 2009, he was re-elected from the same constituency, and in 2014 defeated by K. Kavitha of Bharat Rashtra Samithi.

=== Positions held ===
- Elected as Member of Parliament to 14th Lok Sabha in 2004
- Active Member, House Committee on Subordinate Legislation from 2004
- Active Member, Committee on External & NRI Affairs from 2004
- Active Member, Consultative Committee on Civil Aviation from 2004
- Active Member, Consultative Committee on Defence (Permanent Invitee) from 2004
- Active Member, Committee on Estimates from 2004
- Acting as All India Congress Committee(A.I.C.C) secretary from 2007
- Also Active Member of Indian Council for World Affairs and Bureau of Indian Standards (ISI)
- Elected as Member of Parliament to 15th Lok Sabha in 2009
- Lost seat in 2014 & 2019.
- AICC official spokesperson
- In 2023 Telangana Assembly Elections he contested unsuccessfully as Congress candidate from L.B. Nagar Constituency
- on 9 September 2026 appointed as All India Professionals Congress Chairperson

== Electoral History ==
=== Lok Sabha ===
Year	Constituency	Party	Votes	%	Opponent	Party	Votes	%	Result	Margin	%
2004	Nizamabad	INC	4,42,142	56.51	Syed Yousuf Ali	TDP	3,04,271	38.89	Won	+1,37,871	+17.62
2009	Nizamabad	INC	2,96,504	33.33	Bigala Ganesh Gupta	TRS	2,36,114	26.54	Won	+60,390	+6.79
2014	Nizamabad	INC	2,72,123	26.32	Kalvakuntla Kavitha	TRS	4,39,307	42.48	Lost	-1,67,184	-16.16
2019	Nizamabad	INC	69,240	6.51	Arvind Dharmapuri	BJP	4,80,584	45.20	Lost	-4,11,344	-38.69

== Social service and charity ==
He founded Madhu Yaskhi Foundation in 2003 and donates a portion of his income to the foundation to provide financial assistance to the poor farmers and educate their children up to 12th standard and also to provide health care facilities with the assistance of his wife Dr. Shuchee Yaskhi.

== Awards ==
- He was named NRI of the Year 2005 by NRIInternet.com.

Preceded by Ganga Reddy Gaddam	Member of Parliament from Nizamabad; 2004–2014	Incumbent
