= Jharkhand Pradesh Congress Committee =

Jharkhand affiliate of the Indian National Congress

- President: Keshav Mahto Kamlesh
- Chairman: Pradeep Yadav
- Founded: 15 November 2000
- Split from: BPCC
- Headquarters: Swami Shraddhanand Marg, Ranchi-834001, Jharkhand
- Youth wing: Jharkhand Youth Congress
- Women's wing: Jharkhand Pradesh Mahila Congress Committee
- Ideology: Populism; Social liberalism; Democratic socialism; Social democracy; Secularism
- ECI status: A State Unit of Indian National Congress
- Alliance: Mahagathbandhan
- Seats in Rajya Sabha: 1 / 6
- Seats in Lok Sabha: 2 / 14
- Seats in Jharkhand Legislative Assembly: 16 / 81

Election symbol

Jharkhand Pradesh Congress Committee (JPCC) is the unit of the Indian National Congress, working in the state of Jharkhand. It is responsible for organizing and coordinating the party's activities and campaigns within the state, as well as selecting candidates for local, state, and national elections. The current president of the JPCC is Keshav Mahto Kamlesh. Committee has been active in the state's politics since the formation of the state in 2000.

Its head office is situated at Swami Shraddhanand Marg, Ranchi. Rajesh Thakur is the current president of JPCC. JPCC also has 3 working President Bandhu Tirkey, Jaleshwar Mahato, Shahzada Anwar.

== Structure and Composition ==
S.No.	Name	Designation	Incharge
01	Keshav Mahto Kamlesh	President	Jharkhand Pradesh Congress
02	Bandhu Tirkey	Working President	Jharkhand Pradesh Congress
03	Jaleshwar Mahato	Working President	Jharkhand Pradesh Congress
04	Sahazada Anwar	Working President	Jharkhand Pradesh Congress

== Electoral history ==
=== Legislative Assembly election ===
Year	Party leader	Seats won	Change in seats	Outcome
2005	Sukhdeo Bhagat	9 / 81	▲ New	Opposition
2009	Pradeep Kumar Balmuchu	14 / 81	▲5	Government, later opposition
2014	Alamgir Alam	6 / 81	▼8	Opposition
2019	Rameshwar Oraon	16 / 81	▲10	Coalition Government
2024	Keshav Mahto Kamlesh	16 / 81	Steady	Coalition Government

Jharkhand Congress Legislative Assembly seat count

=== Lok Sabha election ===
Lok Sabha Elections
Year	Lok Sabha	Seats contested	Seats won	(+/-) in seats	% of votes	Vote swing	Popular vote	Outcome
2004	14th	9	6 / 14	▲4	16.28%	▼2.34 (Note: Changes in vote share and seat share in 2004 are calculated using results from 14 constituencies in Bihar in the 1999 Indian general elections.)	15,23,976	Government
2009	15th	9	1 / 14	▼5	15.02%	▼6.42	13,72,639	Government
2014	16th	9	0 / 14	▼1	13.28%	▼1.74	17,24,740	Opposition
2019	17th	7	1 / 14	▲1	15.63%	▲2.13	23,38,466	Opposition
2024	18th	7	2 / 14	▲1	19.19%	▲3.39	33,19,345	Opposition

== List of union ministers ==
=== Cabinet ministers ===
No.	Portrait	Minister	Portfolio	Term in Office			Constituency (House)	Prime Minister
No.	Portrait	Minister	Portfolio	Assumed Office	Left Office	Time in Office	Constituency (House)	Prime Minister
1		Subodh Kant Sahay (born 1951)	Minister of Food Processing Industries	28 May 2009	19 January 2011	1 year, 236 days	Ranchi (Lok Sabha)	Manmohan Singh
1		Subodh Kant Sahay (born 1951)	Minister of Tourism	19 January 2011	27 October 2012	1 year, 282 days	Ranchi (Lok Sabha)	Manmohan Singh

=== Minister of State (Independent charge) ===
No.	Portrait	Minister	Portfolio	Term in Office			Constituency (House)	Prime Minister
No.	Portrait	Minister	Portfolio	Assumed Office	Left Office	Time in Office	Constituency (House)	Prime Minister
1		Subodh Kant Sahay (born 1951)	Minister of State (Independent Charge) of Food Processing Industries	23 May 2004	22 May 2009	4 years, 364 days	Ranchi (Lok Sabha)	Manmohan Singh

== List of deputy chief ministers ==
No	Name	Constituency	Term			Assembly	Chief Minister
1	Stephen Marandi (born 1953)	Dumka	27 August 2008	18 January 2009	144 days	2nd	Shibu Soren

== List of leaders of the opposition ==
No	Portrait	Name	Term			Assembly
1		Rajendra Prasad Singh	7 January 2010	18 January 2013	3 years, 11 days	2nd

== List of presidents ==
S.No	President	Portrait	Term	
1.	Indra Nath Bhagat		2000	December 2001
2.	Pradeep Kumar Balmuchu (Acting President)		December 2001	June 2003
3.	Thomas Hansda		June 2003	2004
4.	Sushila Kerketta		2004	2005
(2).	Pradeep Kumar Balmuchu		2005	2013
5.	Sukhdeo Bhagat		13 May 2013	16 November 2017
6.	Ajoy Kumar		16 November 2017	26 August 2019
7.	Rameshwar Oraon		26 August 2019	25 August 2021
8.	Rajesh Thakur		25 August 2021	16 August 2024
9.	Keshav Mahto Kamlesh		16 August 2024	Incumbent

== List of MPs ==
=== Members of Parliament, Lok Sabha ===
S.No	MPs	Constituency	Term
1.	Furqan Ansari	Godda	2004–2009
2	Chandra Shekhar Dubey	Dhanbad	2004–2009
3	Subodh Kant Sahay	Ranchi	2004–2009
3	Subodh Kant Sahay	Ranchi	2009–2014
4	Bagun Sumbrai	Singhbhum	2004–2009
5	Sushila Kerketta	Khunti	2004–2009
6	Rameshwar Oraon	Lohardaga	2004–2009
7	Geeta Koda	Singhbhum	2019-2024
8	Kali Charan Munda	Khunti	2024–Incumbent
9	Sukhdeo Bhagat	Lohardaga	2024–Incumbent

=== Members of Parliament, Rajya Sabha ===
S.No	Members of Parliament	Term	
S.No	Members of Parliament	Term Start	Term End
1	Ram Kumar Anand	03 April 2000	02 April 2006
2	Mabel Rebello	03 April 2006	02 April 2012
3	Dhiraj Prasad Sahu	24 June 2009	07 July 2010
3	Dhiraj Prasad Sahu	08 July 2010	07 July 2016
3	Dhiraj Prasad Sahu	04 May 2018	03 May 2024
4	Pradeep Kumar Balmuchu	04 May 2012	03 May 2018

== See also ==
- Indian National Congress
- Congress Working Committee
- All India Congress Committee
- Pradesh Congress Committee
