= Chandigarh Territorial Congress Committee =

- President: Harmohinder Singh Lucky
- Headquarters: Congress Bhawan, Sector-35, Chandigarh-160036
- Youth wing: Chandigarh Youth Congress
- Women's wing: Chandigarh Territorial Mahila Congress Committee
- Ideology: Secularism; Social liberalism; Economic liberalism; Social democracy; Civic nationalism
- ECI status: An Union Territorial Unit of Indian National Congress
- Alliance: INDIA
- Seats in Lok Sabha: 1 / 1
- Seats in Municipal Corporation Chandigarh: 6 / 35

Election symbol

Chandigarh Territorial Congress Committee is the wing of the Indian National Congress in the union territory of Chandigarh. Harmohinder Singh Lucky is its current State unit president, is a former mayor of Chandigarh, and has almost 4 decades of experience in politics and social life. Sh. Pawan Kumar Bansal is one of the most prominent faces and seniormost leader of Chandigarh Congress and has been a former MP and Union Minister from Chandigarh. He is currently the Treasurer of Indian National Congress.Shri Manish Tewari of Indian National Congress party is currently the member of parliament from Chandigarh lok sabha seat.

== List of presidents ==
S.no	President	Term	
1.	B. B. Bahl	May 2000	9 January 2015
2.	Pardeep Chhabra	9 January 2015	9 February 2021
3.	Subhash Chawla	9 February 2021	13 June 2022
4.	Harmohinder Singh Lucky	13 June 2022	Incumbent

== Performance in General Elections (Lok Sabha) ==
Lok Sabha Elections
Year	Lok Sabha	Seats contested	Seats won	(+/-) in seats	% of votes	Vote swing	Popular vote	Outcome
1967	4th	1	0 / 1	New entry	23.04%	New entry	11,323	Government
1971	5th	1	1 / 1	▲1	66.85%	▲43.81	48,335	Government
1977	6th	1	0 / 1	▼1	28.37%	▼38.48	30,382	Opposition
1980	7th	1	1 / 1	▲1	49.65%	▲21.28	61,624	Government
1984	8th	1	1 / 1	Steady	66.02%	▲16.37	103,090	Government
1989	9th	1	0 / 1	▼1	40.22%	▼25.80	87,238	Opposition
1991	10th	1	1 / 1	▲1	35.86%	▼4.36	76,628	Government
1996	11th	1	0 / 1	▼1	29.79%	▼6.07	77,168	Opposition
1998	12th	1	0 / 1	Steady	38.70%	▲8.91	109,421	Opposition
1999	13th	1	1 / 1	▲1	47.00%	▲8.30	132,924	Opposition
2004	14th	1	1 / 1	Steady	52.06%	▲5.06	139,880	Government
2009	15th	1	1 / 1	Steady	46.87%	▼5.19	161,042	Government
2014	16th	1	0 / 1	▼1	26.84%	▼20.03	121,720	Opposition
2019	17th	1	0 / 1	Steady	40.35%	▲13.51	184,218	Opposition
2024	18th	1	1 / 1	▲1	48.22%	▲7.87	216,657	Opposition

== See also ==
- Indian National Congress
- Congress Working Committee
- All India Congress Committee
- Pradesh Congress Committee
