= All India Professionals Congress =

Political wing of a party

All India Professionals' Congress
- President: Madhu Yaskhi Goud
- Chairperson: Madhu Yaskhi Goud
- Convener: Rahul Gandhi
- Founder: Rahul Gandhi
- Founded: 2017; 9 years ago
- Headquarters: New Delhi
- Ideology: Secularism Developmentalism; Entrepreneurship Economic liberalism
- National affiliation: Indian National Congress

Website
- www.profcongress.in

The All India Professionals’ Congress, abbreviated as AIPC, is a key wing of the Indian National Congress (INC), established as India’s pioneering political platform dedicated to engaging working professionals, entrepreneurs, and experts from diverse fields in active politics. All India Professionals' Congress was conceptualized and founded by Congress Leader Rahul Gandhi in 2017 to bridge the growing disconnect between professionals and politics in modern India. Launched on 2 August 2017, Rahul Gandhi envisioned AIPC as a structured platform where professionals could contribute their expertise to policymaking, nation-building, and the INC’s progressive agenda. He has consistently encouraged professionals to step into public life, participate as spokespersons, policy leaders, or representatives, and revive their historical role in shaping India’s future.

== List of Presidents ==
S.no	President	Portrait	Term			Home State
1.	Shashi Tharoor		1 August 2017	15 November 2023	6 years, 106 days	Kerala
2.	Praveen Chakravarty		15 November 2023	9 September 2026	2 years, 298 days	Tamil Nadu
3.	Madhu Goud Yaskhi		9 September 2026	Incumbent	60 days	Telangana

== Membership ==
AIPC members, called AIPC fellows, have to be adult, resident citizens of India, possessing an Indian Voter ID and filing Indian tax returns, with professional qualifications or practising a profession in India. The members have to affiliate themselves with the basic unit of the AIPC, called a Chapter, located nearest to their residence or workplace.

== Work ==
The AIPC aims to provide an ecosystem that connects professionals to politics. As a department of the Indian National Congress party, it enables its members to develop social, economic and sectoral policies that serve as inputs to the party's strategy and tactics. Conversely, it enables professionals to gain insight into the political and administrative processes through interactions with the political leadership of the party. Members are also expected to support the party by engaging in specialized research and data analysis in areas of their expertise. The AIPC also facilitates outreach to various national, state, professional and industry institutions and bodies, on both political and professional issues.

The AIPC Rajasthan state unit collaborated with an NGO, Star Foundation, on an initiative called the Blessing Box, that offered food assistance to folk artistes and labourers who were out of work during the COVID-19 pandemic in India.

The AIPC Chhattisgarh and Rajasthan state units helped develop the Indian National Congress' manifesto for the 2022 Uttarakhand state election. Thirty five AIPC teams visited all 70 constituencies, soliciting public opinion on the issues most important in the state and shaping it into concrete policy incorporated in the manifesto.

== Policies ==
The AIPC mandates that its fellows abide by these policies:

- They should not believe in or practise social discrimination of any sort, and will work to eliminate them in society.
- They believe in an integrated society, with no distinctions based gender, religion, race, caste or socioeconomic status.
- They subscribe to the principles and values of the Indian National Congress, and are committed to democracy, secularism and inclusive growth with social justice.
