= Shivshankar Oraon =

Indian politician

Shivshankar Oraon (born 1963) is a leader of Bharatiya Janata Party from Jharkhand. He is elected to Jharkhand Legislative Assembly from Gumla. He studied MA at Ranchi University and Chinese language at School of Languages of Jawaharlal Nehru University.
