= Telangana Pradesh Congress Committee =

- President: Bomma Mahesh Kumar Goud
- Chairman: Anumula Revanth Reddy (Chief Minister)
- Founded: 11 March 2014
- Split from: Andhra Pradesh Congress Committee
- Headquarters: Gandhi Bhavan, Nampally, Hyderabad, Telangana
- Youth wing: Telangana Youth Congress
- Women's wing: Telangana Pradesh Mahila Congress Committee
- Membership: 6 million (March 2022)
- Ideology: Liberalism (Indian); Secularism; Civic nationalism; Social Democracy; Social Justice
- Political position: Centre
- ECI status: A State Unit of Indian National Congress
- Alliance: Indian National Developmental Inclusive Alliance
- Seats in Rajya Sabha: 4 / 7
- Seats in Lok Sabha: 8 / 17
- Seats in Telangana Legislative Council: 13 / 40
- Seats in Telangana Legislative Assembly: 76 / 119

Election symbol

The Telangana Pradesh Congress Committee (Telangana PCC) is the state unit of the Indian National Congress (INC) in the state of Telangana, India. It is responsible for organizing and coordinating the party's activities and campaigns within the state, as well as selecting candidates for local, state, and national elections. The current president of the Telangana PCC is Bomma Mahesh Kumar Goud. The committee has a long history of political influence in the united Andhra Pradesh state, however, it has however, it has historically faced challenges, including fluctuations in electoral support. However, following significant efforts in 2023, the TPCC regained political power in Telangana. With the INC in government in Telangana since December 2023 after the 2023 Telangana Legislative Assembly election, the committee is actively involved in governance and party affairs. And also TPCC has its frontal organisations like ST CELL,SC CELL, MINORITY CELL and BC CELL these are headed by their respective chairpersons in the supervision of TPCC President.

== History ==
The first president of the state unit was Ponnala Lakshmaiah, who was appointed on 11 March 2014, after the bifurcation of Andhra Pradesh. Two months after Lakshmaiah got appointed, the Congress suffered a disastrous defeat in the 2014 Andhra Pradesh Legislative Assembly elections, in which it got 0 out of the 175 seats in the Coastal Andhra and Rayalseema regions whereas in Telangana it managed to muster a measly 21 out of the 119 seats. The party lost around two-thirds of its vote in the united state, compared to 2009. K. Chandrashekhar Rao (known popularly as KCR) of the Telangana Rashtra Samithi stormed to power, riding on a wave of support due to finally achieving Telangana's independence, after years of protests and hunger strikes. The Congress then got routed in the GHMC elections, getting only 2 seats in the 150-member civic body, a far cry from its tally of 54 earlier.

In the 2018 Telangana Legislative Assembly elections, Congress forged an alliance with the Telangana Jana Samithi, the Telugu Desam Party, and the Communist Party of India. Once arch-rivals, these parties came together with the common goal of unseating the TRS and KCR. This alliance was known as the "Praja Kutami" or People's Alliance. The alliance won only 21 seats in the elections out of which the Congress got 19. The alliance in total got about 33% of the vote. The TRS was able to increase its majority from 63 to 88 seats.

In the 2020 Greater Hyderabad Municipal Corporation elections, the Congress only got 2 seats, following which state president N. Uttam Kumar Reddy resigned from his position as TPCC president, although continued as its president until the party found a new president for the state unit. This led to political stalwart Revanth Reddy being appointed as state party chief in 2021.

In the 2023 Telangana Legislative Assembly election, the Congress won the state for the first time. It rode on a wave of anti-incumbency and rural dissatisfaction. PCC Chief Anumula Revanth Reddy was widely credited for the win.

In the 2024 Indian general election, the Congress won the 8 seats with largest 40.10% vote share

== List of presidents ==
| # | President | Portrait | Term | | Duration |
|---|---|---|---|---|---|
| 1. | Ponnala Lakshmaiah | | 11 March 2014 | 2 March 2015 | 356 days |
| 2. | N. Uttam Kumar Reddy | | 2 March 2015 | 7 July 2021 | 6 years, 127 days |
| 3. | Anumula Revanth Reddy | | 7 July 2021 | 6 September 2024 | 3 years, 61 days |
| 4. | Bomma Mahesh Kumar Goud | | 6 September 2024 | Incumbent | 2 years, 75 days |

== List of Chief Ministers of Telangana from the Indian National Congress ==
| # | Name | Portrait | Took office | Left office | Duration |
|---|---|---|---|---|---|
| 1. | Anumula Revanth Reddy | | 7 December 2023 | Incumbent | 2 years, 348 days |

== List of AICC Incharges ==
=== AICC General Secretary incharge ===
| # | Incharge | Portrait | Origin State/UT | Term | | | Ref. |
|---|---|---|---|---|---|---|---|
| 1. | Digvijaya Singh | | Madhya Pradesh | 11 March 2014 | 1 August 2017 | 3 years, 143 days | |
| 2. | Ramachandra Khuntia | | Odisha | 1 August 2017 | 12 Sept 2020 | 3 years, 42 days | |
| 3. | Manickam Tagore | | Tamil Nadu | 12 Sept 2020 | 4 Jan 2023 | 2 years, 114 days | |
| 4. | Manikrao Thakre | | Maharashtra | 5 Jan 2023 | 24 Dec 2023 | 353 days | |
| 5. | Deepa Dasmunsi | | West Bengal | 24 Dec 2023 | 14 Feb 2025 | 1 year, 52 days | |
| 6. | Meenakshi Natarajan | | Madhya Pradesh | 15 Feb 2025 | 14 Nov 2026 | 1 year, 272 days | |
| 7. | B. M. Sandeep | | Karnataka | 14 Nov 2026 | Incumbent | 6 days | |

== Electoral history ==
=== Telangana Legislative Assembly ===
| Year | Portrait | Floor leader | Seats won | Change in seats | Vote share | Swing | Popular vote | Outcome |
|---|---|---|---|---|---|---|---|---|
| 2014 | | Kunduru Jana Reddy | 21 / 119 | ▼29 (Note: Compared to 2009 Legislative Assembly election results in the Telangana region only) | 25.0% | ▼8.1 (Note: Compared to 2009 Legislative Assembly election results in the Telangana region only) | 4,864,808 | Opposition |
| 2018 | | Mallu Bhatti Vikramarka | 19 / 119 | ▼2 | 28.43% | ▲3.43 | 5,883,111 | Opposition |
| 2023 | | Anumula Revanth Reddy | 64 / 119 | ▲46 | 39.40% | ▲10.97 | 9,235,792 | Government |

Telangana Congress Legislative Assembly seat count

=== Lok Sabha ===
| Year | Portrait | Floor leader | Seats won | Change in seats | Vote share | Swing | Popular vote | Outcome |
|---|---|---|---|---|---|---|---|---|
| 2014 | | Mallikarjun Kharge | 2 / 17 | ▼10 (Note: Compared to 2009 Indian general election results in the Telangana region only) | 24.68% | ▼11.86 (Note: Compared to 2009 Indian general election results in the Telangana region only) | 4,755,715 | Opposition |
| 2019 | | Adhir Ranjan Chowdhury | 3 / 17 | ▲1 | 29.79% | ▲5.11 | 5,496,686 | Opposition |
| 2024 | | Rahul Gandhi | 8 / 17 | ▲5 | 40.10% | ▲10.31% | 8,74,1263 | Opposition |

Telangana Congress Lok Sabha seat count

== Office Bearers ==
| Name | Designation | Location | Ref. |
|---|---|---|---|
| B. M. Sandeep | AICC Incharge | Telangana |
| Bomma Mahesh Kumar Goud | President | Nizamabad District |
| Mohammad Azharuddin | Working President | Hyderabad District |
| J. Geeta Reddy | Working President | Hyderabad District |
| Anjan Kumar Yadav | Working President | Hyderabad district |
| Jagga Reddy | Working President | Sangareddy district |
| Sambani Chandrashekar | Senior Vice President | Khammam district |
| Zafar Javeed | Senior Vice President | Hyderabad District |
| Gopishetty Niranjan | Senior Vice President | Hyderabad District |
| Ramesh Maharaj | Senior Vice President | Vikrabad District |
| Komatireddy Venkat Reddy | Star Campaigner | Nalgonda District |
| Mallu Ravi | Disciplinary committee chairman | Nagar Kurnool District |

=== District Congress Committee presidents ===
| Sr.no. | Presidents | DCC |
|---|---|---|
| 1 | Dr Naresh Jadhav | Adilabad |
| 2 | Smt. Athram Suguna | Asifabad |
| 3 | Smt. Thota Devi Prasanna | Badradri Kothagudam |
| 4 | Shri Beerla Ilaiah | Bhongir |
| 5 | Shri M. Rajeev Reddy | Gadwal |
| 6 | Shri Engala Venkat Ram Reddy | Hanmakonda |
| 7 | Shri Syed Khalid Saifullah | Hyderabad |
| 8 | Shri Gajengi Nandaiah | Jagitial |
| 9 | Smt. Lakavath Dhanvanthi | Jangaon |
| 10 | Shri Battu Karunakar | Jayashankar Bhupalpalle |
| 11 | Shri Mallikarjun Ale | Kamareddy |
| 12 | Shri Medipally Sathyam | Karimnagar |
| 13 | Shri V Anjan Kumar | Karimnagar Corporation |
| 14 | Shri Motha Rohit Mudiraj | Khairatabad |
| 15 | Shri Nuthi Satyanarayana | Khammam |
| 16 | Shri Deepak Chowdhary | Khammam Corporation |
| 17 | Dr. Bhukhya Uma | Mahbubabad |
| 18 | Shri A Sanjeev Mudiraj | Mahbubnagar |
| 19 | Shri Pinninti Raghunath Reddy | Mancherial |
| 20 | Shri Shivannagari Anjaneyulu Goud | Medak |
| 21 | Shri Thotakura Vajresh Yadav | Medchal Malkajgiri |
| 22 | Shri Paidakula Ashok | Mulugu |
| 23 | Dr. Chikkudu Vamshi Krishna | Nagarkurnool |
| 24 | Shri Punna Kailash Netha | Nalgonda |
| 25 | Shri Kollukuduru Prashanth Kumar Reddy | Narayanpet |
| 26 | Shri Vedma Bhojju | Nirmal |
| 27 | Shri Katpally Nagesh Reddy | Nizamabad |
| 28 | Shri Bobblili Ramakrishna | Nizamabad Corporation |
| 29 | Shri MS Raj Thakur | Peddapalli |
| 30 | Shri Sangeetham Srinivas | Rajanna Sircilla |

== Headquarters ==
The headquarters are located at Gandhi Bhavan, near Nampally in Hyderabad, the capital city of Telangana.

== Activities ==
=== Membership drive ===
Then Telangana PCC under the leadership of Ponnala started a membership drive across all districts in the Telangana State. According to the sources while the initial target was 10 lakh registrations, TPCC was surprised by the response received from the people of Telangana. The target now is revised to 17 lakh registrations by the end of Dec 2014. Membership Booklets were distributed as part of this membership drive. The theme of this membership drive was "I am an Indian, I am a member of the Indian National Congress".

=== Telangana Vileena Dinam ===
PCC chief Ponnala Lakshmaiah announced on 17 September as the Telangana Vileena Dinam (Telangana combined day). Telangana Congress party leaders celebrated the event in Gandhi Bhavan, Hyderabad. During his speech, he reminded everyone that the dream of a separate Telangana state was achieved due to Sonia Gandhi's UPA Government's efforts.
